

290001–290100 

|-bgcolor=#d6d6d6
| 290001 Uebersax ||  ||  || August 10, 2005 || Vicques || M. Ory || AEG || align=right | 3.0 km || 
|-id=002 bgcolor=#E9E9E9
| 290002 ||  || — || August 12, 2005 || Wrightwood || J. W. Young || HNS || align=right | 1.7 km || 
|-id=003 bgcolor=#E9E9E9
| 290003 ||  || — || August 12, 2005 || Needville || Needville Obs. || — || align=right | 2.7 km || 
|-id=004 bgcolor=#E9E9E9
| 290004 ||  || — || August 6, 2005 || Palomar || NEAT || — || align=right | 2.2 km || 
|-id=005 bgcolor=#E9E9E9
| 290005 ||  || — || August 10, 2005 || Cerro Tololo || M. W. Buie || MRX || align=right | 1.1 km || 
|-id=006 bgcolor=#d6d6d6
| 290006 ||  || — || August 6, 2005 || Palomar || NEAT || 7:4* || align=right | 3.6 km || 
|-id=007 bgcolor=#fefefe
| 290007 ||  || — || August 22, 2005 || Palomar || NEAT || NYS || align=right data-sort-value="0.96" | 960 m || 
|-id=008 bgcolor=#fefefe
| 290008 ||  || — || August 22, 2005 || Palomar || NEAT || — || align=right data-sort-value="0.98" | 980 m || 
|-id=009 bgcolor=#fefefe
| 290009 ||  || — || August 22, 2005 || Palomar || NEAT || NYS || align=right data-sort-value="0.89" | 890 m || 
|-id=010 bgcolor=#fefefe
| 290010 ||  || — || August 24, 2005 || Palomar || NEAT || — || align=right data-sort-value="0.85" | 850 m || 
|-id=011 bgcolor=#d6d6d6
| 290011 ||  || — || August 25, 2005 || Palomar || NEAT || ALA || align=right | 4.6 km || 
|-id=012 bgcolor=#E9E9E9
| 290012 ||  || — || August 25, 2005 || Palomar || NEAT || — || align=right | 2.0 km || 
|-id=013 bgcolor=#E9E9E9
| 290013 ||  || — || August 27, 2005 || Junk Bond || D. Healy || — || align=right | 1.4 km || 
|-id=014 bgcolor=#E9E9E9
| 290014 ||  || — || August 24, 2005 || Palomar || NEAT || — || align=right | 2.5 km || 
|-id=015 bgcolor=#E9E9E9
| 290015 ||  || — || August 25, 2005 || Palomar || NEAT || — || align=right data-sort-value="0.96" | 960 m || 
|-id=016 bgcolor=#d6d6d6
| 290016 ||  || — || August 25, 2005 || Palomar || NEAT || — || align=right | 5.0 km || 
|-id=017 bgcolor=#d6d6d6
| 290017 ||  || — || August 25, 2005 || Palomar || NEAT || 7:4 || align=right | 4.9 km || 
|-id=018 bgcolor=#E9E9E9
| 290018 ||  || — || August 25, 2005 || Palomar || NEAT || NEM || align=right | 2.8 km || 
|-id=019 bgcolor=#d6d6d6
| 290019 ||  || — || August 25, 2005 || Palomar || NEAT || EUP || align=right | 5.7 km || 
|-id=020 bgcolor=#d6d6d6
| 290020 ||  || — || August 25, 2005 || Palomar || NEAT || — || align=right | 3.6 km || 
|-id=021 bgcolor=#d6d6d6
| 290021 ||  || — || August 26, 2005 || Campo Imperatore || CINEOS || — || align=right | 2.8 km || 
|-id=022 bgcolor=#d6d6d6
| 290022 ||  || — || August 26, 2005 || Anderson Mesa || LONEOS || — || align=right | 6.2 km || 
|-id=023 bgcolor=#E9E9E9
| 290023 ||  || — || August 26, 2005 || Anderson Mesa || LONEOS || — || align=right | 3.4 km || 
|-id=024 bgcolor=#E9E9E9
| 290024 ||  || — || August 27, 2005 || Kitt Peak || Spacewatch || — || align=right | 2.1 km || 
|-id=025 bgcolor=#d6d6d6
| 290025 ||  || — || August 27, 2005 || Kitt Peak || Spacewatch || — || align=right | 4.1 km || 
|-id=026 bgcolor=#d6d6d6
| 290026 ||  || — || August 27, 2005 || Kitt Peak || Spacewatch || EOS || align=right | 2.9 km || 
|-id=027 bgcolor=#fefefe
| 290027 ||  || — || August 27, 2005 || Kitt Peak || Spacewatch || V || align=right data-sort-value="0.82" | 820 m || 
|-id=028 bgcolor=#E9E9E9
| 290028 ||  || — || August 27, 2005 || Kitt Peak || Spacewatch || — || align=right | 2.9 km || 
|-id=029 bgcolor=#d6d6d6
| 290029 ||  || — || August 27, 2005 || Kitt Peak || Spacewatch || HYG || align=right | 4.0 km || 
|-id=030 bgcolor=#fefefe
| 290030 ||  || — || August 28, 2005 || Vicques || M. Ory || — || align=right | 2.3 km || 
|-id=031 bgcolor=#fefefe
| 290031 ||  || — || August 23, 2005 || Haleakala || NEAT || FLO || align=right data-sort-value="0.79" | 790 m || 
|-id=032 bgcolor=#E9E9E9
| 290032 ||  || — || August 24, 2005 || Palomar || NEAT || — || align=right | 1.8 km || 
|-id=033 bgcolor=#fefefe
| 290033 ||  || — || August 22, 2005 || Palomar || NEAT || NYS || align=right data-sort-value="0.75" | 750 m || 
|-id=034 bgcolor=#E9E9E9
| 290034 ||  || — || August 24, 2005 || Palomar || NEAT || — || align=right | 2.0 km || 
|-id=035 bgcolor=#fefefe
| 290035 ||  || — || August 24, 2005 || Palomar || NEAT || MAS || align=right data-sort-value="0.80" | 800 m || 
|-id=036 bgcolor=#E9E9E9
| 290036 ||  || — || August 24, 2005 || Palomar || NEAT || — || align=right | 3.4 km || 
|-id=037 bgcolor=#E9E9E9
| 290037 ||  || — || August 25, 2005 || Palomar || NEAT || — || align=right | 1.5 km || 
|-id=038 bgcolor=#d6d6d6
| 290038 ||  || — || August 25, 2005 || Palomar || NEAT || EOS || align=right | 2.4 km || 
|-id=039 bgcolor=#d6d6d6
| 290039 ||  || — || August 25, 2005 || Palomar || NEAT || — || align=right | 4.0 km || 
|-id=040 bgcolor=#fefefe
| 290040 ||  || — || August 25, 2005 || Palomar || NEAT || NYS || align=right | 1.1 km || 
|-id=041 bgcolor=#fefefe
| 290041 ||  || — || August 25, 2005 || Campo Imperatore || CINEOS || — || align=right data-sort-value="0.99" | 990 m || 
|-id=042 bgcolor=#fefefe
| 290042 ||  || — || August 25, 2005 || Campo Imperatore || CINEOS || — || align=right data-sort-value="0.73" | 730 m || 
|-id=043 bgcolor=#E9E9E9
| 290043 ||  || — || August 26, 2005 || Anderson Mesa || LONEOS || — || align=right | 1.1 km || 
|-id=044 bgcolor=#fefefe
| 290044 ||  || — || August 26, 2005 || Palomar || NEAT || MAS || align=right data-sort-value="0.88" | 880 m || 
|-id=045 bgcolor=#d6d6d6
| 290045 ||  || — || August 26, 2005 || Palomar || NEAT || EOS || align=right | 2.6 km || 
|-id=046 bgcolor=#fefefe
| 290046 ||  || — || August 26, 2005 || Palomar || NEAT || LCI || align=right | 1.3 km || 
|-id=047 bgcolor=#E9E9E9
| 290047 ||  || — || August 26, 2005 || Palomar || NEAT || — || align=right | 2.2 km || 
|-id=048 bgcolor=#d6d6d6
| 290048 ||  || — || August 26, 2005 || Palomar || NEAT || EOS || align=right | 2.5 km || 
|-id=049 bgcolor=#d6d6d6
| 290049 ||  || — || August 26, 2005 || Palomar || NEAT || 7:4 || align=right | 4.0 km || 
|-id=050 bgcolor=#d6d6d6
| 290050 ||  || — || August 26, 2005 || Palomar || NEAT || EOS || align=right | 2.7 km || 
|-id=051 bgcolor=#E9E9E9
| 290051 ||  || — || August 26, 2005 || Palomar || NEAT || MRX || align=right | 1.4 km || 
|-id=052 bgcolor=#d6d6d6
| 290052 ||  || — || August 26, 2005 || Anderson Mesa || LONEOS || — || align=right | 4.4 km || 
|-id=053 bgcolor=#d6d6d6
| 290053 ||  || — || August 28, 2005 || Kitt Peak || Spacewatch || 615 || align=right | 2.1 km || 
|-id=054 bgcolor=#E9E9E9
| 290054 ||  || — || August 28, 2005 || Kitt Peak || Spacewatch || PAD || align=right | 1.8 km || 
|-id=055 bgcolor=#fefefe
| 290055 ||  || — || August 30, 2005 || Vicques || M. Ory || NYS || align=right data-sort-value="0.83" | 830 m || 
|-id=056 bgcolor=#fefefe
| 290056 ||  || — || August 29, 2005 || Drebach || Drebach Obs. || — || align=right data-sort-value="0.77" | 770 m || 
|-id=057 bgcolor=#d6d6d6
| 290057 ||  || — || August 25, 2005 || Palomar || NEAT || — || align=right | 3.0 km || 
|-id=058 bgcolor=#E9E9E9
| 290058 ||  || — || August 25, 2005 || Palomar || NEAT || — || align=right | 1.1 km || 
|-id=059 bgcolor=#E9E9E9
| 290059 ||  || — || August 25, 2005 || Palomar || NEAT || — || align=right | 1.8 km || 
|-id=060 bgcolor=#fefefe
| 290060 ||  || — || August 26, 2005 || Palomar || NEAT || V || align=right data-sort-value="0.83" | 830 m || 
|-id=061 bgcolor=#E9E9E9
| 290061 ||  || — || August 26, 2005 || Palomar || NEAT || — || align=right | 1.7 km || 
|-id=062 bgcolor=#E9E9E9
| 290062 ||  || — || August 26, 2005 || Palomar || NEAT || AGN || align=right | 1.6 km || 
|-id=063 bgcolor=#d6d6d6
| 290063 ||  || — || August 27, 2005 || Anderson Mesa || LONEOS || — || align=right | 3.4 km || 
|-id=064 bgcolor=#E9E9E9
| 290064 ||  || — || August 27, 2005 || Anderson Mesa || LONEOS || DOR || align=right | 2.5 km || 
|-id=065 bgcolor=#E9E9E9
| 290065 ||  || — || August 28, 2005 || Anderson Mesa || LONEOS || — || align=right | 2.5 km || 
|-id=066 bgcolor=#d6d6d6
| 290066 ||  || — || August 28, 2005 || Siding Spring || SSS || EUP || align=right | 6.0 km || 
|-id=067 bgcolor=#fefefe
| 290067 ||  || — || August 29, 2005 || Anderson Mesa || LONEOS || NYS || align=right data-sort-value="0.87" | 870 m || 
|-id=068 bgcolor=#fefefe
| 290068 ||  || — || August 29, 2005 || Socorro || LINEAR || — || align=right data-sort-value="0.84" | 840 m || 
|-id=069 bgcolor=#fefefe
| 290069 ||  || — || August 29, 2005 || Socorro || LINEAR || — || align=right data-sort-value="0.91" | 910 m || 
|-id=070 bgcolor=#FA8072
| 290070 ||  || — || August 29, 2005 || Socorro || LINEAR || — || align=right data-sort-value="0.91" | 910 m || 
|-id=071 bgcolor=#d6d6d6
| 290071 ||  || — || August 29, 2005 || Anderson Mesa || LONEOS || — || align=right | 4.3 km || 
|-id=072 bgcolor=#fefefe
| 290072 ||  || — || August 29, 2005 || Anderson Mesa || LONEOS || H || align=right data-sort-value="0.74" | 740 m || 
|-id=073 bgcolor=#fefefe
| 290073 ||  || — || August 29, 2005 || Anderson Mesa || LONEOS || FLO || align=right data-sort-value="0.82" | 820 m || 
|-id=074 bgcolor=#FA8072
| 290074 Donasadock ||  ||  || August 29, 2005 || Saint-Sulpice || B. Christophe || — || align=right | 1.2 km || 
|-id=075 bgcolor=#fefefe
| 290075 ||  || — || August 25, 2005 || Palomar || NEAT || NYS || align=right data-sort-value="0.66" | 660 m || 
|-id=076 bgcolor=#d6d6d6
| 290076 ||  || — || August 29, 2005 || Kitt Peak || Spacewatch || EOS || align=right | 2.1 km || 
|-id=077 bgcolor=#d6d6d6
| 290077 ||  || — || August 30, 2005 || Kitt Peak || Spacewatch || EOS || align=right | 2.8 km || 
|-id=078 bgcolor=#d6d6d6
| 290078 ||  || — || August 30, 2005 || Socorro || LINEAR || — || align=right | 5.6 km || 
|-id=079 bgcolor=#fefefe
| 290079 ||  || — || August 31, 2005 || Calvin-Rehoboth || L. A. Molnar || NYS || align=right data-sort-value="0.63" | 630 m || 
|-id=080 bgcolor=#d6d6d6
| 290080 ||  || — || August 30, 2005 || Socorro || LINEAR || — || align=right | 3.1 km || 
|-id=081 bgcolor=#fefefe
| 290081 ||  || — || August 22, 2005 || Palomar || NEAT || — || align=right data-sort-value="0.65" | 650 m || 
|-id=082 bgcolor=#d6d6d6
| 290082 ||  || — || August 22, 2005 || Palomar || NEAT || THM || align=right | 2.9 km || 
|-id=083 bgcolor=#E9E9E9
| 290083 ||  || — || August 26, 2005 || Palomar || NEAT || — || align=right | 2.6 km || 
|-id=084 bgcolor=#fefefe
| 290084 ||  || — || August 26, 2005 || Palomar || NEAT || — || align=right | 1.2 km || 
|-id=085 bgcolor=#fefefe
| 290085 ||  || — || August 27, 2005 || Palomar || NEAT || V || align=right data-sort-value="0.84" | 840 m || 
|-id=086 bgcolor=#d6d6d6
| 290086 ||  || — || August 27, 2005 || Palomar || NEAT || — || align=right | 4.5 km || 
|-id=087 bgcolor=#fefefe
| 290087 ||  || — || August 27, 2005 || Palomar || NEAT || — || align=right data-sort-value="0.90" | 900 m || 
|-id=088 bgcolor=#fefefe
| 290088 ||  || — || August 27, 2005 || Palomar || NEAT || — || align=right data-sort-value="0.87" | 870 m || 
|-id=089 bgcolor=#E9E9E9
| 290089 ||  || — || August 27, 2005 || Palomar || NEAT || — || align=right | 2.4 km || 
|-id=090 bgcolor=#E9E9E9
| 290090 ||  || — || August 27, 2005 || Palomar || NEAT || — || align=right | 2.9 km || 
|-id=091 bgcolor=#E9E9E9
| 290091 ||  || — || August 27, 2005 || Palomar || NEAT || — || align=right | 1.6 km || 
|-id=092 bgcolor=#E9E9E9
| 290092 ||  || — || August 27, 2005 || Palomar || NEAT || — || align=right | 2.1 km || 
|-id=093 bgcolor=#E9E9E9
| 290093 ||  || — || August 27, 2005 || Palomar || NEAT || — || align=right | 1.0 km || 
|-id=094 bgcolor=#fefefe
| 290094 ||  || — || August 27, 2005 || Palomar || NEAT || — || align=right | 1.3 km || 
|-id=095 bgcolor=#d6d6d6
| 290095 ||  || — || August 27, 2005 || Palomar || NEAT || — || align=right | 2.9 km || 
|-id=096 bgcolor=#d6d6d6
| 290096 ||  || — || August 27, 2005 || Palomar || NEAT || — || align=right | 3.1 km || 
|-id=097 bgcolor=#E9E9E9
| 290097 ||  || — || August 27, 2005 || Palomar || NEAT || HEN || align=right | 1.4 km || 
|-id=098 bgcolor=#E9E9E9
| 290098 ||  || — || August 27, 2005 || Palomar || NEAT || NEM || align=right | 2.4 km || 
|-id=099 bgcolor=#d6d6d6
| 290099 ||  || — || August 27, 2005 || Palomar || NEAT || — || align=right | 3.2 km || 
|-id=100 bgcolor=#d6d6d6
| 290100 ||  || — || August 27, 2005 || Palomar || NEAT || — || align=right | 4.4 km || 
|}

290101–290200 

|-bgcolor=#d6d6d6
| 290101 ||  || — || August 27, 2005 || Palomar || NEAT || — || align=right | 3.8 km || 
|-id=102 bgcolor=#d6d6d6
| 290102 ||  || — || August 27, 2005 || Palomar || NEAT || HYG || align=right | 3.7 km || 
|-id=103 bgcolor=#d6d6d6
| 290103 ||  || — || August 27, 2005 || Palomar || NEAT || THM || align=right | 3.0 km || 
|-id=104 bgcolor=#E9E9E9
| 290104 ||  || — || August 27, 2005 || Palomar || NEAT || — || align=right | 1.8 km || 
|-id=105 bgcolor=#d6d6d6
| 290105 ||  || — || August 28, 2005 || Kitt Peak || Spacewatch || EOS || align=right | 2.4 km || 
|-id=106 bgcolor=#E9E9E9
| 290106 ||  || — || August 28, 2005 || Kitt Peak || Spacewatch || — || align=right | 1.7 km || 
|-id=107 bgcolor=#fefefe
| 290107 ||  || — || August 28, 2005 || Kitt Peak || Spacewatch || FLO || align=right data-sort-value="0.73" | 730 m || 
|-id=108 bgcolor=#E9E9E9
| 290108 ||  || — || August 28, 2005 || Kitt Peak || Spacewatch || AGN || align=right | 1.3 km || 
|-id=109 bgcolor=#d6d6d6
| 290109 ||  || — || August 28, 2005 || Kitt Peak || Spacewatch || CHA || align=right | 3.0 km || 
|-id=110 bgcolor=#d6d6d6
| 290110 ||  || — || August 28, 2005 || Kitt Peak || Spacewatch || — || align=right | 2.4 km || 
|-id=111 bgcolor=#E9E9E9
| 290111 ||  || — || August 28, 2005 || Kitt Peak || Spacewatch || — || align=right | 1.1 km || 
|-id=112 bgcolor=#E9E9E9
| 290112 ||  || — || August 28, 2005 || Kitt Peak || Spacewatch || — || align=right | 1.9 km || 
|-id=113 bgcolor=#d6d6d6
| 290113 ||  || — || August 28, 2005 || Kitt Peak || Spacewatch || KOR || align=right | 1.7 km || 
|-id=114 bgcolor=#E9E9E9
| 290114 ||  || — || August 28, 2005 || Kitt Peak || Spacewatch || — || align=right | 2.5 km || 
|-id=115 bgcolor=#d6d6d6
| 290115 ||  || — || August 28, 2005 || Kitt Peak || Spacewatch || — || align=right | 2.6 km || 
|-id=116 bgcolor=#d6d6d6
| 290116 ||  || — || August 28, 2005 || Kitt Peak || Spacewatch || — || align=right | 4.6 km || 
|-id=117 bgcolor=#d6d6d6
| 290117 ||  || — || August 28, 2005 || Kitt Peak || Spacewatch || KAR || align=right | 1.6 km || 
|-id=118 bgcolor=#d6d6d6
| 290118 ||  || — || August 28, 2005 || Kitt Peak || Spacewatch || KAR || align=right | 1.4 km || 
|-id=119 bgcolor=#E9E9E9
| 290119 ||  || — || August 28, 2005 || Kitt Peak || Spacewatch || AGN || align=right | 1.2 km || 
|-id=120 bgcolor=#E9E9E9
| 290120 ||  || — || August 28, 2005 || Kitt Peak || Spacewatch || — || align=right | 1.6 km || 
|-id=121 bgcolor=#d6d6d6
| 290121 ||  || — || August 28, 2005 || Kitt Peak || Spacewatch || — || align=right | 2.6 km || 
|-id=122 bgcolor=#E9E9E9
| 290122 ||  || — || August 28, 2005 || Kitt Peak || Spacewatch || — || align=right | 1.1 km || 
|-id=123 bgcolor=#E9E9E9
| 290123 ||  || — || August 28, 2005 || Kitt Peak || Spacewatch || — || align=right | 2.6 km || 
|-id=124 bgcolor=#FA8072
| 290124 ||  || — || August 30, 2005 || Socorro || LINEAR || — || align=right | 1.1 km || 
|-id=125 bgcolor=#d6d6d6
| 290125 ||  || — || August 30, 2005 || Anderson Mesa || LONEOS || — || align=right | 3.9 km || 
|-id=126 bgcolor=#fefefe
| 290126 ||  || — || August 30, 2005 || Anderson Mesa || LONEOS || — || align=right data-sort-value="0.93" | 930 m || 
|-id=127 bgcolor=#d6d6d6
| 290127 Linakostenko ||  ||  || August 29, 2005 || Andrushivka || Andrushivka Obs. || EUP || align=right | 7.7 km || 
|-id=128 bgcolor=#fefefe
| 290128 ||  || — || August 27, 2005 || Kitt Peak || Spacewatch || — || align=right data-sort-value="0.97" | 970 m || 
|-id=129 bgcolor=#d6d6d6
| 290129 Rátzlászló ||  ||  || August 31, 2005 || Piszkéstető || K. Sárneczky, Z. Kuli || — || align=right | 2.8 km || 
|-id=130 bgcolor=#fefefe
| 290130 ||  || — || August 27, 2005 || Campo Imperatore || CINEOS || — || align=right data-sort-value="0.91" | 910 m || 
|-id=131 bgcolor=#fefefe
| 290131 ||  || — || August 27, 2005 || Palomar || NEAT || MAS || align=right data-sort-value="0.97" | 970 m || 
|-id=132 bgcolor=#fefefe
| 290132 ||  || — || August 27, 2005 || Palomar || NEAT || — || align=right data-sort-value="0.99" | 990 m || 
|-id=133 bgcolor=#fefefe
| 290133 ||  || — || August 27, 2005 || Palomar || NEAT || — || align=right | 1.1 km || 
|-id=134 bgcolor=#E9E9E9
| 290134 ||  || — || August 27, 2005 || Palomar || NEAT || — || align=right | 2.4 km || 
|-id=135 bgcolor=#d6d6d6
| 290135 ||  || — || August 27, 2005 || Palomar || NEAT || — || align=right | 6.4 km || 
|-id=136 bgcolor=#d6d6d6
| 290136 ||  || — || August 27, 2005 || Palomar || NEAT || — || align=right | 3.6 km || 
|-id=137 bgcolor=#fefefe
| 290137 ||  || — || August 28, 2005 || Siding Spring || SSS || V || align=right data-sort-value="0.78" | 780 m || 
|-id=138 bgcolor=#fefefe
| 290138 ||  || — || August 30, 2005 || Palomar || NEAT || NYS || align=right data-sort-value="0.72" | 720 m || 
|-id=139 bgcolor=#d6d6d6
| 290139 ||  || — || August 30, 2005 || Palomar || NEAT || — || align=right | 5.3 km || 
|-id=140 bgcolor=#fefefe
| 290140 ||  || — || August 28, 2005 || Anderson Mesa || LONEOS || H || align=right data-sort-value="0.83" | 830 m || 
|-id=141 bgcolor=#d6d6d6
| 290141 ||  || — || August 28, 2005 || Siding Spring || SSS || — || align=right | 4.2 km || 
|-id=142 bgcolor=#E9E9E9
| 290142 ||  || — || August 30, 2005 || Palomar || NEAT || — || align=right | 1.6 km || 
|-id=143 bgcolor=#E9E9E9
| 290143 ||  || — || August 26, 2005 || Palomar || NEAT || — || align=right | 2.2 km || 
|-id=144 bgcolor=#E9E9E9
| 290144 ||  || — || August 29, 2005 || Palomar || NEAT || — || align=right | 3.2 km || 
|-id=145 bgcolor=#fefefe
| 290145 ||  || — || August 31, 2005 || Socorro || LINEAR || — || align=right | 1.0 km || 
|-id=146 bgcolor=#d6d6d6
| 290146 ||  || — || August 31, 2005 || Kitt Peak || Spacewatch || EUP || align=right | 4.4 km || 
|-id=147 bgcolor=#fefefe
| 290147 ||  || — || August 31, 2005 || Kitt Peak || Spacewatch || FLO || align=right data-sort-value="0.67" | 670 m || 
|-id=148 bgcolor=#E9E9E9
| 290148 ||  || — || August 31, 2005 || Anderson Mesa || LONEOS || — || align=right | 2.9 km || 
|-id=149 bgcolor=#E9E9E9
| 290149 ||  || — || August 31, 2005 || Kitt Peak || Spacewatch || NEM || align=right | 2.2 km || 
|-id=150 bgcolor=#fefefe
| 290150 ||  || — || August 28, 2005 || Kitt Peak || Spacewatch || — || align=right data-sort-value="0.93" | 930 m || 
|-id=151 bgcolor=#d6d6d6
| 290151 ||  || — || August 30, 2005 || Palomar || NEAT || — || align=right | 4.2 km || 
|-id=152 bgcolor=#d6d6d6
| 290152 ||  || — || August 25, 2005 || Palomar || NEAT || EOS || align=right | 2.6 km || 
|-id=153 bgcolor=#E9E9E9
| 290153 ||  || — || August 26, 2005 || Palomar || NEAT || — || align=right | 2.5 km || 
|-id=154 bgcolor=#E9E9E9
| 290154 ||  || — || August 27, 2005 || Palomar || NEAT || — || align=right | 2.1 km || 
|-id=155 bgcolor=#d6d6d6
| 290155 ||  || — || August 27, 2005 || Palomar || NEAT || 615 || align=right | 2.5 km || 
|-id=156 bgcolor=#fefefe
| 290156 ||  || — || August 27, 2005 || Mauna Kea || P. A. Wiegert || — || align=right data-sort-value="0.71" | 710 m || 
|-id=157 bgcolor=#d6d6d6
| 290157 ||  || — || August 29, 2005 || Anderson Mesa || LONEOS || — || align=right | 4.7 km || 
|-id=158 bgcolor=#d6d6d6
| 290158 ||  || — || August 30, 2005 || Kitt Peak || Spacewatch || KOR || align=right | 1.6 km || 
|-id=159 bgcolor=#E9E9E9
| 290159 ||  || — || August 31, 2005 || Kitt Peak || Spacewatch || — || align=right | 1.5 km || 
|-id=160 bgcolor=#E9E9E9
| 290160 ||  || — || September 1, 2005 || Palomar || NEAT || — || align=right data-sort-value="0.98" | 980 m || 
|-id=161 bgcolor=#E9E9E9
| 290161 ||  || — || September 2, 2005 || Palomar || NEAT || WAT || align=right | 2.4 km || 
|-id=162 bgcolor=#E9E9E9
| 290162 ||  || — || September 7, 2005 || Uccle || T. Pauwels || — || align=right | 1.8 km || 
|-id=163 bgcolor=#d6d6d6
| 290163 ||  || — || September 11, 2005 || Junk Bond || D. Healy || 7:4 || align=right | 5.3 km || 
|-id=164 bgcolor=#E9E9E9
| 290164 ||  || — || September 1, 2005 || Kitt Peak || Spacewatch || — || align=right | 1.0 km || 
|-id=165 bgcolor=#d6d6d6
| 290165 ||  || — || September 1, 2005 || Kitt Peak || Spacewatch || LUT || align=right | 8.2 km || 
|-id=166 bgcolor=#E9E9E9
| 290166 ||  || — || September 1, 2005 || Kitt Peak || Spacewatch || — || align=right | 2.1 km || 
|-id=167 bgcolor=#d6d6d6
| 290167 ||  || — || September 1, 2005 || Palomar || NEAT || — || align=right | 3.0 km || 
|-id=168 bgcolor=#d6d6d6
| 290168 ||  || — || September 6, 2005 || Campo Catino || CAOS || EOS || align=right | 2.6 km || 
|-id=169 bgcolor=#fefefe
| 290169 ||  || — || September 6, 2005 || Anderson Mesa || LONEOS || V || align=right data-sort-value="0.89" | 890 m || 
|-id=170 bgcolor=#d6d6d6
| 290170 ||  || — || September 11, 2005 || Socorro || LINEAR || Tj (2.99) || align=right | 4.6 km || 
|-id=171 bgcolor=#d6d6d6
| 290171 ||  || — || September 8, 2005 || Uccle || T. Pauwels || — || align=right | 2.2 km || 
|-id=172 bgcolor=#E9E9E9
| 290172 ||  || — || September 11, 2005 || Kitt Peak || Spacewatch || — || align=right | 1.6 km || 
|-id=173 bgcolor=#d6d6d6
| 290173 ||  || — || September 12, 2005 || Goodricke-Pigott || R. A. Tucker || — || align=right | 4.7 km || 
|-id=174 bgcolor=#d6d6d6
| 290174 ||  || — || September 13, 2005 || Catalina || CSS || — || align=right | 4.1 km || 
|-id=175 bgcolor=#fefefe
| 290175 ||  || — || September 8, 2005 || Socorro || LINEAR || — || align=right | 2.9 km || 
|-id=176 bgcolor=#fefefe
| 290176 ||  || — || September 14, 2005 || Kitt Peak || Spacewatch || NYS || align=right data-sort-value="0.60" | 600 m || 
|-id=177 bgcolor=#fefefe
| 290177 ||  || — || September 1, 2005 || Kitt Peak || Spacewatch || NYS || align=right data-sort-value="0.71" | 710 m || 
|-id=178 bgcolor=#d6d6d6
| 290178 ||  || — || September 3, 2005 || Catalina || CSS || EUP || align=right | 4.9 km || 
|-id=179 bgcolor=#E9E9E9
| 290179 ||  || — || September 14, 2005 || Apache Point || A. C. Becker || — || align=right data-sort-value="0.83" | 830 m || 
|-id=180 bgcolor=#E9E9E9
| 290180 ||  || — || September 3, 2005 || Catalina || CSS || GEF || align=right | 1.6 km || 
|-id=181 bgcolor=#E9E9E9
| 290181 ||  || — || September 3, 2005 || Mauna Kea || P. A. Wiegert || — || align=right | 3.2 km || 
|-id=182 bgcolor=#d6d6d6
| 290182 ||  || — || September 14, 2005 || Kitt Peak || Spacewatch || — || align=right | 3.0 km || 
|-id=183 bgcolor=#E9E9E9
| 290183 ||  || — || September 25, 2005 || Wrightwood || J. W. Young || — || align=right | 2.0 km || 
|-id=184 bgcolor=#E9E9E9
| 290184 ||  || — || September 23, 2005 || Catalina || CSS || MRX || align=right | 1.2 km || 
|-id=185 bgcolor=#E9E9E9
| 290185 ||  || — || September 23, 2005 || Kitt Peak || Spacewatch || — || align=right | 2.9 km || 
|-id=186 bgcolor=#E9E9E9
| 290186 ||  || — || September 24, 2005 || Kitt Peak || Spacewatch || — || align=right | 1.5 km || 
|-id=187 bgcolor=#d6d6d6
| 290187 ||  || — || September 23, 2005 || Kitt Peak || Spacewatch || — || align=right | 5.9 km || 
|-id=188 bgcolor=#d6d6d6
| 290188 ||  || — || September 23, 2005 || Kitt Peak || Spacewatch || BRA || align=right | 1.8 km || 
|-id=189 bgcolor=#E9E9E9
| 290189 ||  || — || September 24, 2005 || Kitt Peak || Spacewatch || PAD || align=right | 1.5 km || 
|-id=190 bgcolor=#E9E9E9
| 290190 ||  || — || September 26, 2005 || Kitt Peak || Spacewatch || AGN || align=right | 1.2 km || 
|-id=191 bgcolor=#d6d6d6
| 290191 ||  || — || September 26, 2005 || Kitt Peak || Spacewatch || — || align=right | 3.2 km || 
|-id=192 bgcolor=#d6d6d6
| 290192 ||  || — || September 23, 2005 || Kitt Peak || Spacewatch || — || align=right | 2.4 km || 
|-id=193 bgcolor=#fefefe
| 290193 ||  || — || September 23, 2005 || Catalina || CSS || MAS || align=right data-sort-value="0.77" | 770 m || 
|-id=194 bgcolor=#d6d6d6
| 290194 ||  || — || September 24, 2005 || Anderson Mesa || LONEOS || EOS || align=right | 3.9 km || 
|-id=195 bgcolor=#E9E9E9
| 290195 ||  || — || September 23, 2005 || Kitt Peak || Spacewatch || — || align=right | 2.4 km || 
|-id=196 bgcolor=#E9E9E9
| 290196 ||  || — || September 23, 2005 || Kitt Peak || Spacewatch || — || align=right | 2.5 km || 
|-id=197 bgcolor=#E9E9E9
| 290197 ||  || — || September 23, 2005 || Kitt Peak || Spacewatch || — || align=right data-sort-value="0.89" | 890 m || 
|-id=198 bgcolor=#d6d6d6
| 290198 ||  || — || September 23, 2005 || Kitt Peak || Spacewatch || — || align=right | 2.6 km || 
|-id=199 bgcolor=#d6d6d6
| 290199 ||  || — || September 23, 2005 || Kitt Peak || Spacewatch || — || align=right | 4.2 km || 
|-id=200 bgcolor=#E9E9E9
| 290200 ||  || — || September 23, 2005 || Kitt Peak || Spacewatch || — || align=right | 2.7 km || 
|}

290201–290300 

|-bgcolor=#E9E9E9
| 290201 ||  || — || September 23, 2005 || Kitt Peak || Spacewatch || AGN || align=right | 1.4 km || 
|-id=202 bgcolor=#d6d6d6
| 290202 ||  || — || September 24, 2005 || Kitt Peak || Spacewatch || — || align=right | 4.2 km || 
|-id=203 bgcolor=#d6d6d6
| 290203 ||  || — || September 24, 2005 || Kitt Peak || Spacewatch || — || align=right | 3.1 km || 
|-id=204 bgcolor=#d6d6d6
| 290204 ||  || — || September 24, 2005 || Kitt Peak || Spacewatch || EOS || align=right | 2.1 km || 
|-id=205 bgcolor=#d6d6d6
| 290205 ||  || — || September 24, 2005 || Kitt Peak || Spacewatch || — || align=right | 4.9 km || 
|-id=206 bgcolor=#E9E9E9
| 290206 ||  || — || September 24, 2005 || Kitt Peak || Spacewatch || — || align=right | 2.0 km || 
|-id=207 bgcolor=#d6d6d6
| 290207 ||  || — || September 24, 2005 || Kitt Peak || Spacewatch || KOR || align=right | 1.4 km || 
|-id=208 bgcolor=#fefefe
| 290208 ||  || — || September 24, 2005 || Kitt Peak || Spacewatch || — || align=right data-sort-value="0.89" | 890 m || 
|-id=209 bgcolor=#d6d6d6
| 290209 ||  || — || September 24, 2005 || Kitt Peak || Spacewatch || — || align=right | 3.7 km || 
|-id=210 bgcolor=#E9E9E9
| 290210 ||  || — || September 24, 2005 || Kitt Peak || Spacewatch || INO || align=right | 1.4 km || 
|-id=211 bgcolor=#d6d6d6
| 290211 ||  || — || September 24, 2005 || Kitt Peak || Spacewatch || CHA || align=right | 2.4 km || 
|-id=212 bgcolor=#d6d6d6
| 290212 ||  || — || September 24, 2005 || Kitt Peak || Spacewatch || — || align=right | 3.5 km || 
|-id=213 bgcolor=#E9E9E9
| 290213 ||  || — || September 24, 2005 || Kitt Peak || Spacewatch || — || align=right | 1.2 km || 
|-id=214 bgcolor=#E9E9E9
| 290214 ||  || — || September 24, 2005 || Kitt Peak || Spacewatch || — || align=right | 2.8 km || 
|-id=215 bgcolor=#d6d6d6
| 290215 ||  || — || September 24, 2005 || Kitt Peak || Spacewatch || — || align=right | 3.6 km || 
|-id=216 bgcolor=#fefefe
| 290216 ||  || — || September 24, 2005 || Kitt Peak || Spacewatch || NYS || align=right data-sort-value="0.64" | 640 m || 
|-id=217 bgcolor=#d6d6d6
| 290217 ||  || — || September 24, 2005 || Palomar || NEAT || — || align=right | 5.4 km || 
|-id=218 bgcolor=#d6d6d6
| 290218 ||  || — || September 24, 2005 || Kitt Peak || Spacewatch || — || align=right | 3.2 km || 
|-id=219 bgcolor=#E9E9E9
| 290219 ||  || — || September 24, 2005 || Kitt Peak || Spacewatch || — || align=right | 2.2 km || 
|-id=220 bgcolor=#E9E9E9
| 290220 ||  || — || September 24, 2005 || Kitt Peak || Spacewatch || — || align=right | 1.2 km || 
|-id=221 bgcolor=#fefefe
| 290221 ||  || — || September 25, 2005 || Kitt Peak || Spacewatch || — || align=right | 1.1 km || 
|-id=222 bgcolor=#E9E9E9
| 290222 ||  || — || September 25, 2005 || Kitt Peak || Spacewatch || — || align=right | 1.7 km || 
|-id=223 bgcolor=#d6d6d6
| 290223 ||  || — || September 25, 2005 || Kitt Peak || Spacewatch || EOS || align=right | 1.7 km || 
|-id=224 bgcolor=#fefefe
| 290224 ||  || — || September 26, 2005 || Kitt Peak || Spacewatch || MAS || align=right data-sort-value="0.78" | 780 m || 
|-id=225 bgcolor=#E9E9E9
| 290225 ||  || — || September 26, 2005 || Kitt Peak || Spacewatch || — || align=right | 1.2 km || 
|-id=226 bgcolor=#d6d6d6
| 290226 ||  || — || September 26, 2005 || Kitt Peak || Spacewatch || KAR || align=right | 1.1 km || 
|-id=227 bgcolor=#E9E9E9
| 290227 ||  || — || September 26, 2005 || Kitt Peak || Spacewatch || HEN || align=right | 1.1 km || 
|-id=228 bgcolor=#E9E9E9
| 290228 ||  || — || September 26, 2005 || Palomar || NEAT || — || align=right | 2.4 km || 
|-id=229 bgcolor=#E9E9E9
| 290229 ||  || — || September 26, 2005 || Kitt Peak || Spacewatch || — || align=right | 1.8 km || 
|-id=230 bgcolor=#d6d6d6
| 290230 ||  || — || September 26, 2005 || Kitt Peak || Spacewatch || — || align=right | 2.9 km || 
|-id=231 bgcolor=#E9E9E9
| 290231 ||  || — || September 26, 2005 || Kitt Peak || Spacewatch || — || align=right | 1.5 km || 
|-id=232 bgcolor=#E9E9E9
| 290232 ||  || — || September 26, 2005 || Palomar || NEAT || — || align=right | 1.8 km || 
|-id=233 bgcolor=#fefefe
| 290233 ||  || — || September 30, 2005 || Socorro || LINEAR || H || align=right | 1.0 km || 
|-id=234 bgcolor=#E9E9E9
| 290234 ||  || — || September 23, 2005 || Kitt Peak || Spacewatch || HNA || align=right | 2.9 km || 
|-id=235 bgcolor=#d6d6d6
| 290235 ||  || — || September 24, 2005 || Kitt Peak || Spacewatch || KOR || align=right | 1.4 km || 
|-id=236 bgcolor=#E9E9E9
| 290236 ||  || — || September 24, 2005 || Kitt Peak || Spacewatch || NEM || align=right | 2.3 km || 
|-id=237 bgcolor=#d6d6d6
| 290237 ||  || — || September 24, 2005 || Kitt Peak || Spacewatch || — || align=right | 2.3 km || 
|-id=238 bgcolor=#d6d6d6
| 290238 ||  || — || September 24, 2005 || Kitt Peak || Spacewatch || — || align=right | 2.9 km || 
|-id=239 bgcolor=#d6d6d6
| 290239 ||  || — || September 24, 2005 || Kitt Peak || Spacewatch || — || align=right | 3.0 km || 
|-id=240 bgcolor=#E9E9E9
| 290240 ||  || — || September 24, 2005 || Kitt Peak || Spacewatch || — || align=right | 2.4 km || 
|-id=241 bgcolor=#d6d6d6
| 290241 ||  || — || September 24, 2005 || Kitt Peak || Spacewatch || — || align=right | 3.7 km || 
|-id=242 bgcolor=#d6d6d6
| 290242 ||  || — || September 24, 2005 || Kitt Peak || Spacewatch || URS || align=right | 4.7 km || 
|-id=243 bgcolor=#d6d6d6
| 290243 ||  || — || September 25, 2005 || Palomar || NEAT || — || align=right | 5.7 km || 
|-id=244 bgcolor=#d6d6d6
| 290244 ||  || — || September 25, 2005 || Kitt Peak || Spacewatch || EOS || align=right | 1.9 km || 
|-id=245 bgcolor=#E9E9E9
| 290245 ||  || — || September 25, 2005 || Kitt Peak || Spacewatch || WIT || align=right | 1.2 km || 
|-id=246 bgcolor=#d6d6d6
| 290246 ||  || — || September 25, 2005 || Kitt Peak || Spacewatch || EOS || align=right | 2.3 km || 
|-id=247 bgcolor=#E9E9E9
| 290247 ||  || — || September 25, 2005 || Kitt Peak || Spacewatch || — || align=right | 2.5 km || 
|-id=248 bgcolor=#fefefe
| 290248 ||  || — || September 25, 2005 || Kitt Peak || Spacewatch || — || align=right | 1.0 km || 
|-id=249 bgcolor=#d6d6d6
| 290249 ||  || — || September 25, 2005 || Kitt Peak || Spacewatch || — || align=right | 3.4 km || 
|-id=250 bgcolor=#E9E9E9
| 290250 ||  || — || September 26, 2005 || Catalina || CSS || EUN || align=right | 1.7 km || 
|-id=251 bgcolor=#d6d6d6
| 290251 ||  || — || September 26, 2005 || Kitt Peak || Spacewatch || 3:2 || align=right | 5.1 km || 
|-id=252 bgcolor=#d6d6d6
| 290252 ||  || — || September 26, 2005 || Kitt Peak || Spacewatch || HIL3:2 || align=right | 5.1 km || 
|-id=253 bgcolor=#d6d6d6
| 290253 ||  || — || September 26, 2005 || Kitt Peak || Spacewatch || — || align=right | 2.8 km || 
|-id=254 bgcolor=#E9E9E9
| 290254 ||  || — || September 26, 2005 || Palomar || NEAT || — || align=right | 3.1 km || 
|-id=255 bgcolor=#E9E9E9
| 290255 ||  || — || September 27, 2005 || Kitt Peak || Spacewatch || — || align=right | 1.8 km || 
|-id=256 bgcolor=#d6d6d6
| 290256 ||  || — || September 27, 2005 || Kitt Peak || Spacewatch || KOR || align=right | 1.3 km || 
|-id=257 bgcolor=#fefefe
| 290257 ||  || — || September 28, 2005 || Palomar || NEAT || SUL || align=right | 2.7 km || 
|-id=258 bgcolor=#E9E9E9
| 290258 ||  || — || September 29, 2005 || Kitt Peak || Spacewatch || — || align=right | 2.6 km || 
|-id=259 bgcolor=#d6d6d6
| 290259 ||  || — || September 29, 2005 || Anderson Mesa || LONEOS || — || align=right | 5.8 km || 
|-id=260 bgcolor=#E9E9E9
| 290260 ||  || — || September 29, 2005 || Anderson Mesa || LONEOS || — || align=right | 1.1 km || 
|-id=261 bgcolor=#fefefe
| 290261 ||  || — || September 29, 2005 || Anderson Mesa || LONEOS || — || align=right data-sort-value="0.86" | 860 m || 
|-id=262 bgcolor=#E9E9E9
| 290262 ||  || — || September 29, 2005 || Kitt Peak || Spacewatch || — || align=right | 2.2 km || 
|-id=263 bgcolor=#fefefe
| 290263 ||  || — || September 29, 2005 || Palomar || NEAT || NYS || align=right data-sort-value="0.73" | 730 m || 
|-id=264 bgcolor=#d6d6d6
| 290264 ||  || — || September 29, 2005 || Mount Lemmon || Mount Lemmon Survey || — || align=right | 3.1 km || 
|-id=265 bgcolor=#fefefe
| 290265 ||  || — || September 29, 2005 || Kitt Peak || Spacewatch || — || align=right data-sort-value="0.76" | 760 m || 
|-id=266 bgcolor=#E9E9E9
| 290266 ||  || — || September 24, 2005 || Kitt Peak || Spacewatch || — || align=right | 2.7 km || 
|-id=267 bgcolor=#E9E9E9
| 290267 ||  || — || September 24, 2005 || Kitt Peak || Spacewatch || MRX || align=right | 1.5 km || 
|-id=268 bgcolor=#fefefe
| 290268 ||  || — || September 25, 2005 || Kitt Peak || Spacewatch || — || align=right data-sort-value="0.72" | 720 m || 
|-id=269 bgcolor=#E9E9E9
| 290269 ||  || — || September 25, 2005 || Kitt Peak || Spacewatch || WIT || align=right | 1.4 km || 
|-id=270 bgcolor=#d6d6d6
| 290270 ||  || — || September 25, 2005 || Kitt Peak || Spacewatch || — || align=right | 4.2 km || 
|-id=271 bgcolor=#d6d6d6
| 290271 ||  || — || September 25, 2005 || Kitt Peak || Spacewatch || — || align=right | 2.3 km || 
|-id=272 bgcolor=#E9E9E9
| 290272 ||  || — || September 25, 2005 || Kitt Peak || Spacewatch || — || align=right | 2.0 km || 
|-id=273 bgcolor=#d6d6d6
| 290273 ||  || — || September 25, 2005 || Kitt Peak || Spacewatch || KOR || align=right | 1.4 km || 
|-id=274 bgcolor=#E9E9E9
| 290274 ||  || — || September 25, 2005 || Kitt Peak || Spacewatch || — || align=right data-sort-value="0.96" | 960 m || 
|-id=275 bgcolor=#fefefe
| 290275 ||  || — || September 25, 2005 || Kitt Peak || Spacewatch || — || align=right | 1.1 km || 
|-id=276 bgcolor=#E9E9E9
| 290276 ||  || — || September 25, 2005 || Kitt Peak || Spacewatch || — || align=right | 2.5 km || 
|-id=277 bgcolor=#E9E9E9
| 290277 ||  || — || September 25, 2005 || Kitt Peak || Spacewatch || — || align=right | 1.6 km || 
|-id=278 bgcolor=#E9E9E9
| 290278 ||  || — || September 25, 2005 || Kitt Peak || Spacewatch || — || align=right | 1.3 km || 
|-id=279 bgcolor=#d6d6d6
| 290279 ||  || — || September 25, 2005 || Kitt Peak || Spacewatch || — || align=right | 2.6 km || 
|-id=280 bgcolor=#E9E9E9
| 290280 ||  || — || September 25, 2005 || Kitt Peak || Spacewatch || — || align=right | 1.0 km || 
|-id=281 bgcolor=#fefefe
| 290281 ||  || — || September 26, 2005 || Kitt Peak || Spacewatch || NYS || align=right data-sort-value="0.77" | 770 m || 
|-id=282 bgcolor=#d6d6d6
| 290282 ||  || — || September 26, 2005 || Kitt Peak || Spacewatch || TEL || align=right | 1.7 km || 
|-id=283 bgcolor=#fefefe
| 290283 ||  || — || September 26, 2005 || Kitt Peak || Spacewatch || NYS || align=right data-sort-value="0.65" | 650 m || 
|-id=284 bgcolor=#E9E9E9
| 290284 ||  || — || September 27, 2005 || Kitt Peak || Spacewatch || — || align=right | 2.3 km || 
|-id=285 bgcolor=#E9E9E9
| 290285 ||  || — || September 27, 2005 || Kitt Peak || Spacewatch || — || align=right data-sort-value="0.99" | 990 m || 
|-id=286 bgcolor=#E9E9E9
| 290286 ||  || — || September 27, 2005 || Kitt Peak || Spacewatch || — || align=right | 2.1 km || 
|-id=287 bgcolor=#d6d6d6
| 290287 ||  || — || September 27, 2005 || Kitt Peak || Spacewatch || KOR || align=right | 1.3 km || 
|-id=288 bgcolor=#E9E9E9
| 290288 ||  || — || September 27, 2005 || Palomar || NEAT || JUN || align=right | 1.6 km || 
|-id=289 bgcolor=#E9E9E9
| 290289 ||  || — || September 28, 2005 || Palomar || NEAT || — || align=right | 2.6 km || 
|-id=290 bgcolor=#E9E9E9
| 290290 ||  || — || September 28, 2005 || Palomar || NEAT || — || align=right | 3.0 km || 
|-id=291 bgcolor=#d6d6d6
| 290291 ||  || — || September 29, 2005 || Kitt Peak || Spacewatch || 7:4 || align=right | 4.9 km || 
|-id=292 bgcolor=#E9E9E9
| 290292 ||  || — || September 29, 2005 || Kitt Peak || Spacewatch || — || align=right data-sort-value="0.99" | 990 m || 
|-id=293 bgcolor=#E9E9E9
| 290293 ||  || — || September 29, 2005 || Kitt Peak || Spacewatch || NEM || align=right | 2.9 km || 
|-id=294 bgcolor=#d6d6d6
| 290294 ||  || — || September 29, 2005 || Kitt Peak || Spacewatch || HYG || align=right | 2.7 km || 
|-id=295 bgcolor=#d6d6d6
| 290295 ||  || — || September 29, 2005 || Kitt Peak || Spacewatch || — || align=right | 3.6 km || 
|-id=296 bgcolor=#E9E9E9
| 290296 ||  || — || September 29, 2005 || Kitt Peak || Spacewatch || HOF || align=right | 3.7 km || 
|-id=297 bgcolor=#E9E9E9
| 290297 ||  || — || September 29, 2005 || Kitt Peak || Spacewatch || — || align=right | 1.7 km || 
|-id=298 bgcolor=#fefefe
| 290298 ||  || — || September 29, 2005 || Kitt Peak || Spacewatch || NYS || align=right data-sort-value="0.83" | 830 m || 
|-id=299 bgcolor=#fefefe
| 290299 ||  || — || September 29, 2005 || Kitt Peak || Spacewatch || — || align=right data-sort-value="0.86" | 860 m || 
|-id=300 bgcolor=#E9E9E9
| 290300 ||  || — || September 29, 2005 || Kitt Peak || Spacewatch || MRX || align=right | 1.3 km || 
|}

290301–290400 

|-bgcolor=#fefefe
| 290301 ||  || — || September 29, 2005 || Anderson Mesa || LONEOS || NYS || align=right data-sort-value="0.76" | 760 m || 
|-id=302 bgcolor=#d6d6d6
| 290302 ||  || — || September 29, 2005 || Anderson Mesa || LONEOS || HYG || align=right | 3.3 km || 
|-id=303 bgcolor=#d6d6d6
| 290303 ||  || — || September 29, 2005 || Kitt Peak || Spacewatch || LUT || align=right | 6.6 km || 
|-id=304 bgcolor=#E9E9E9
| 290304 ||  || — || September 29, 2005 || Kitt Peak || Spacewatch || — || align=right | 1.9 km || 
|-id=305 bgcolor=#E9E9E9
| 290305 ||  || — || September 29, 2005 || Kitt Peak || Spacewatch || — || align=right | 2.2 km || 
|-id=306 bgcolor=#E9E9E9
| 290306 ||  || — || September 29, 2005 || Kitt Peak || Spacewatch || AGN || align=right | 1.4 km || 
|-id=307 bgcolor=#d6d6d6
| 290307 ||  || — || September 29, 2005 || Kitt Peak || Spacewatch || EOS || align=right | 2.4 km || 
|-id=308 bgcolor=#d6d6d6
| 290308 ||  || — || September 29, 2005 || Kitt Peak || Spacewatch || — || align=right | 2.6 km || 
|-id=309 bgcolor=#d6d6d6
| 290309 ||  || — || September 29, 2005 || Kitt Peak || Spacewatch || — || align=right | 3.4 km || 
|-id=310 bgcolor=#d6d6d6
| 290310 ||  || — || September 29, 2005 || Mount Lemmon || Mount Lemmon Survey || — || align=right | 2.8 km || 
|-id=311 bgcolor=#E9E9E9
| 290311 ||  || — || September 29, 2005 || Kitt Peak || Spacewatch || — || align=right | 3.3 km || 
|-id=312 bgcolor=#E9E9E9
| 290312 ||  || — || September 29, 2005 || Palomar || NEAT || JUN || align=right | 1.2 km || 
|-id=313 bgcolor=#E9E9E9
| 290313 ||  || — || September 29, 2005 || Mount Lemmon || Mount Lemmon Survey || — || align=right | 2.1 km || 
|-id=314 bgcolor=#d6d6d6
| 290314 ||  || — || September 30, 2005 || Catalina || CSS || — || align=right | 4.7 km || 
|-id=315 bgcolor=#d6d6d6
| 290315 ||  || — || September 30, 2005 || Kitt Peak || Spacewatch || KOR || align=right | 1.2 km || 
|-id=316 bgcolor=#E9E9E9
| 290316 ||  || — || September 30, 2005 || Kitt Peak || Spacewatch || WIT || align=right | 1.1 km || 
|-id=317 bgcolor=#d6d6d6
| 290317 ||  || — || September 30, 2005 || Mount Lemmon || Mount Lemmon Survey || KAR || align=right | 1.2 km || 
|-id=318 bgcolor=#d6d6d6
| 290318 ||  || — || September 30, 2005 || Mount Lemmon || Mount Lemmon Survey || KOR || align=right | 1.4 km || 
|-id=319 bgcolor=#E9E9E9
| 290319 ||  || — || September 30, 2005 || Anderson Mesa || LONEOS || BRG || align=right | 1.6 km || 
|-id=320 bgcolor=#d6d6d6
| 290320 ||  || — || September 30, 2005 || Palomar || NEAT || — || align=right | 4.8 km || 
|-id=321 bgcolor=#fefefe
| 290321 ||  || — || September 30, 2005 || Kitt Peak || Spacewatch || — || align=right | 1.2 km || 
|-id=322 bgcolor=#d6d6d6
| 290322 ||  || — || September 30, 2005 || Palomar || NEAT || — || align=right | 3.4 km || 
|-id=323 bgcolor=#E9E9E9
| 290323 ||  || — || September 30, 2005 || Mount Lemmon || Mount Lemmon Survey || — || align=right | 1.4 km || 
|-id=324 bgcolor=#d6d6d6
| 290324 ||  || — || September 30, 2005 || Kitt Peak || Spacewatch || — || align=right | 4.0 km || 
|-id=325 bgcolor=#d6d6d6
| 290325 ||  || — || September 30, 2005 || Catalina || CSS || MEL || align=right | 4.5 km || 
|-id=326 bgcolor=#fefefe
| 290326 ||  || — || September 30, 2005 || Anderson Mesa || LONEOS || — || align=right | 1.9 km || 
|-id=327 bgcolor=#E9E9E9
| 290327 ||  || — || September 30, 2005 || Mount Lemmon || Mount Lemmon Survey || — || align=right | 3.3 km || 
|-id=328 bgcolor=#fefefe
| 290328 ||  || — || September 30, 2005 || Mount Lemmon || Mount Lemmon Survey || — || align=right data-sort-value="0.89" | 890 m || 
|-id=329 bgcolor=#E9E9E9
| 290329 ||  || — || September 29, 2005 || Mount Lemmon || Mount Lemmon Survey || — || align=right | 2.1 km || 
|-id=330 bgcolor=#d6d6d6
| 290330 ||  || — || September 29, 2005 || Kitt Peak || Spacewatch || — || align=right | 3.2 km || 
|-id=331 bgcolor=#d6d6d6
| 290331 ||  || — || September 30, 2005 || Kitt Peak || Spacewatch || THM || align=right | 3.1 km || 
|-id=332 bgcolor=#d6d6d6
| 290332 ||  || — || September 30, 2005 || Kitt Peak || Spacewatch || CHA || align=right | 1.8 km || 
|-id=333 bgcolor=#E9E9E9
| 290333 ||  || — || September 30, 2005 || Kitt Peak || Spacewatch || HEN || align=right | 1.2 km || 
|-id=334 bgcolor=#d6d6d6
| 290334 ||  || — || September 30, 2005 || Mount Lemmon || Mount Lemmon Survey || KOR || align=right | 1.5 km || 
|-id=335 bgcolor=#E9E9E9
| 290335 ||  || — || September 29, 2005 || Mount Lemmon || Mount Lemmon Survey || — || align=right | 1.9 km || 
|-id=336 bgcolor=#E9E9E9
| 290336 ||  || — || September 29, 2005 || Kitt Peak || Spacewatch || — || align=right | 1.4 km || 
|-id=337 bgcolor=#E9E9E9
| 290337 ||  || — || September 29, 2005 || Kitt Peak || Spacewatch || AEO || align=right | 1.4 km || 
|-id=338 bgcolor=#fefefe
| 290338 ||  || — || September 29, 2005 || Kitt Peak || Spacewatch || — || align=right data-sort-value="0.70" | 700 m || 
|-id=339 bgcolor=#E9E9E9
| 290339 ||  || — || September 29, 2005 || Kitt Peak || Spacewatch || — || align=right | 2.8 km || 
|-id=340 bgcolor=#E9E9E9
| 290340 ||  || — || September 29, 2005 || Kitt Peak || Spacewatch || — || align=right | 2.5 km || 
|-id=341 bgcolor=#d6d6d6
| 290341 ||  || — || September 30, 2005 || Kitt Peak || Spacewatch || THM || align=right | 2.2 km || 
|-id=342 bgcolor=#E9E9E9
| 290342 ||  || — || September 30, 2005 || Mount Lemmon || Mount Lemmon Survey || PAD || align=right | 1.6 km || 
|-id=343 bgcolor=#d6d6d6
| 290343 ||  || — || September 30, 2005 || Mount Lemmon || Mount Lemmon Survey || — || align=right | 3.3 km || 
|-id=344 bgcolor=#d6d6d6
| 290344 ||  || — || September 30, 2005 || Kitt Peak || Spacewatch || EOS || align=right | 3.6 km || 
|-id=345 bgcolor=#E9E9E9
| 290345 ||  || — || September 30, 2005 || Kitt Peak || Spacewatch || — || align=right | 2.1 km || 
|-id=346 bgcolor=#E9E9E9
| 290346 ||  || — || September 30, 2005 || Kitt Peak || Spacewatch || HEN || align=right | 1.3 km || 
|-id=347 bgcolor=#d6d6d6
| 290347 ||  || — || September 30, 2005 || Kitt Peak || Spacewatch || K-2 || align=right | 1.5 km || 
|-id=348 bgcolor=#E9E9E9
| 290348 ||  || — || September 30, 2005 || Mount Lemmon || Mount Lemmon Survey || — || align=right | 1.3 km || 
|-id=349 bgcolor=#E9E9E9
| 290349 ||  || — || September 23, 2005 || Catalina || CSS || — || align=right | 2.8 km || 
|-id=350 bgcolor=#E9E9E9
| 290350 ||  || — || September 23, 2005 || Kitt Peak || Spacewatch || NEM || align=right | 3.5 km || 
|-id=351 bgcolor=#E9E9E9
| 290351 ||  || — || September 24, 2005 || Palomar || NEAT || HNA || align=right | 3.1 km || 
|-id=352 bgcolor=#E9E9E9
| 290352 ||  || — || September 24, 2005 || Palomar || NEAT || WIT || align=right | 1.5 km || 
|-id=353 bgcolor=#E9E9E9
| 290353 ||  || — || September 24, 2005 || Palomar || NEAT || — || align=right | 2.7 km || 
|-id=354 bgcolor=#d6d6d6
| 290354 ||  || — || September 23, 2005 || Kitt Peak || Spacewatch || — || align=right | 2.9 km || 
|-id=355 bgcolor=#d6d6d6
| 290355 ||  || — || September 24, 2005 || Anderson Mesa || LONEOS || EOS || align=right | 3.0 km || 
|-id=356 bgcolor=#d6d6d6
| 290356 ||  || — || September 24, 2005 || Kitt Peak || Spacewatch || — || align=right | 2.5 km || 
|-id=357 bgcolor=#fefefe
| 290357 ||  || — || September 27, 2005 || Junk Bond || D. Healy || — || align=right data-sort-value="0.73" | 730 m || 
|-id=358 bgcolor=#d6d6d6
| 290358 ||  || — || September 23, 2005 || Kitt Peak || Spacewatch || — || align=right | 3.4 km || 
|-id=359 bgcolor=#d6d6d6
| 290359 ||  || — || September 23, 2005 || Kitt Peak || Spacewatch || — || align=right | 3.6 km || 
|-id=360 bgcolor=#fefefe
| 290360 ||  || — || September 23, 2005 || Kitt Peak || Spacewatch || NYS || align=right data-sort-value="0.73" | 730 m || 
|-id=361 bgcolor=#fefefe
| 290361 ||  || — || September 24, 2005 || Palomar || NEAT || — || align=right data-sort-value="0.85" | 850 m || 
|-id=362 bgcolor=#E9E9E9
| 290362 ||  || — || September 24, 2005 || Kitt Peak || Spacewatch || HOF || align=right | 3.2 km || 
|-id=363 bgcolor=#E9E9E9
| 290363 ||  || — || September 25, 2005 || Kitt Peak || Spacewatch || WIT || align=right | 1.4 km || 
|-id=364 bgcolor=#E9E9E9
| 290364 ||  || — || September 26, 2005 || Palomar || NEAT || — || align=right | 1.4 km || 
|-id=365 bgcolor=#d6d6d6
| 290365 ||  || — || September 29, 2005 || Anderson Mesa || LONEOS || HYG || align=right | 3.0 km || 
|-id=366 bgcolor=#d6d6d6
| 290366 ||  || — || September 30, 2005 || Palomar || NEAT || — || align=right | 3.7 km || 
|-id=367 bgcolor=#d6d6d6
| 290367 ||  || — || September 28, 2005 || Palomar || NEAT || — || align=right | 4.5 km || 
|-id=368 bgcolor=#d6d6d6
| 290368 ||  || — || September 29, 2005 || Kitt Peak || Spacewatch || — || align=right | 3.2 km || 
|-id=369 bgcolor=#E9E9E9
| 290369 ||  || — || September 29, 2005 || Anderson Mesa || LONEOS || KON || align=right | 2.4 km || 
|-id=370 bgcolor=#d6d6d6
| 290370 ||  || — || September 30, 2005 || Anderson Mesa || LONEOS || 615 || align=right | 1.5 km || 
|-id=371 bgcolor=#d6d6d6
| 290371 ||  || — || September 30, 2005 || Mount Lemmon || Mount Lemmon Survey || — || align=right | 3.7 km || 
|-id=372 bgcolor=#E9E9E9
| 290372 ||  || — || September 29, 2005 || Mount Lemmon || Mount Lemmon Survey || — || align=right | 1.6 km || 
|-id=373 bgcolor=#E9E9E9
| 290373 ||  || — || September 29, 2005 || Kitt Peak || Spacewatch || — || align=right | 1.3 km || 
|-id=374 bgcolor=#E9E9E9
| 290374 ||  || — || September 27, 2005 || Palomar || NEAT || NEM || align=right | 3.5 km || 
|-id=375 bgcolor=#E9E9E9
| 290375 ||  || — || September 21, 2005 || Apache Point || A. C. Becker || — || align=right | 1.3 km || 
|-id=376 bgcolor=#d6d6d6
| 290376 ||  || — || September 25, 2005 || Apache Point || A. C. Becker || — || align=right | 3.2 km || 
|-id=377 bgcolor=#E9E9E9
| 290377 ||  || — || September 25, 2005 || Apache Point || A. C. Becker || MAR || align=right | 1.1 km || 
|-id=378 bgcolor=#d6d6d6
| 290378 ||  || — || September 23, 2005 || Kitt Peak || Spacewatch || THM || align=right | 2.5 km || 
|-id=379 bgcolor=#d6d6d6
| 290379 ||  || — || September 29, 2005 || Mount Lemmon || Mount Lemmon Survey || 7:4 || align=right | 4.0 km || 
|-id=380 bgcolor=#E9E9E9
| 290380 ||  || — || September 25, 2005 || Kitt Peak || Spacewatch || WIT || align=right | 1.4 km || 
|-id=381 bgcolor=#d6d6d6
| 290381 ||  || — || September 24, 2005 || Kitt Peak || Spacewatch || — || align=right | 2.7 km || 
|-id=382 bgcolor=#E9E9E9
| 290382 ||  || — || September 28, 2005 || Palomar || NEAT || — || align=right | 2.6 km || 
|-id=383 bgcolor=#E9E9E9
| 290383 ||  || — || September 29, 2005 || Mount Lemmon || Mount Lemmon Survey || AST || align=right | 1.9 km || 
|-id=384 bgcolor=#d6d6d6
| 290384 ||  || — || September 30, 2005 || Anderson Mesa || LONEOS || — || align=right | 3.6 km || 
|-id=385 bgcolor=#d6d6d6
| 290385 ||  || — || September 28, 2005 || Palomar || NEAT || — || align=right | 5.0 km || 
|-id=386 bgcolor=#d6d6d6
| 290386 ||  || — || September 30, 2005 || Catalina || CSS || EOS || align=right | 2.9 km || 
|-id=387 bgcolor=#fefefe
| 290387 ||  || — || October 1, 2005 || Catalina || CSS || — || align=right | 1.1 km || 
|-id=388 bgcolor=#d6d6d6
| 290388 ||  || — || October 1, 2005 || Catalina || CSS || — || align=right | 4.7 km || 
|-id=389 bgcolor=#d6d6d6
| 290389 ||  || — || October 1, 2005 || Kitt Peak || Spacewatch || SYL7:4 || align=right | 5.0 km || 
|-id=390 bgcolor=#d6d6d6
| 290390 ||  || — || October 1, 2005 || Kitt Peak || Spacewatch || KOR || align=right | 1.7 km || 
|-id=391 bgcolor=#d6d6d6
| 290391 ||  || — || October 1, 2005 || Kitt Peak || Spacewatch || — || align=right | 2.3 km || 
|-id=392 bgcolor=#d6d6d6
| 290392 ||  || — || October 1, 2005 || Kitt Peak || Spacewatch || — || align=right | 3.1 km || 
|-id=393 bgcolor=#E9E9E9
| 290393 ||  || — || October 1, 2005 || Kitt Peak || Spacewatch || — || align=right | 1.6 km || 
|-id=394 bgcolor=#fefefe
| 290394 ||  || — || October 1, 2005 || Catalina || CSS || FLO || align=right data-sort-value="0.85" | 850 m || 
|-id=395 bgcolor=#E9E9E9
| 290395 ||  || — || October 1, 2005 || Catalina || CSS || — || align=right | 2.3 km || 
|-id=396 bgcolor=#fefefe
| 290396 ||  || — || October 1, 2005 || Mount Lemmon || Mount Lemmon Survey || — || align=right data-sort-value="0.87" | 870 m || 
|-id=397 bgcolor=#E9E9E9
| 290397 ||  || — || October 1, 2005 || Catalina || CSS || — || align=right | 3.3 km || 
|-id=398 bgcolor=#E9E9E9
| 290398 ||  || — || October 1, 2005 || Mount Lemmon || Mount Lemmon Survey || MAR || align=right | 1.8 km || 
|-id=399 bgcolor=#E9E9E9
| 290399 ||  || — || October 4, 2005 || Palomar || NEAT || EUN || align=right | 1.9 km || 
|-id=400 bgcolor=#d6d6d6
| 290400 ||  || — || October 1, 2005 || Kitt Peak || Spacewatch || CHA || align=right | 2.0 km || 
|}

290401–290500 

|-bgcolor=#d6d6d6
| 290401 ||  || — || October 1, 2005 || Kitt Peak || Spacewatch || — || align=right | 2.3 km || 
|-id=402 bgcolor=#fefefe
| 290402 ||  || — || October 1, 2005 || Kitt Peak || Spacewatch || NYS || align=right data-sort-value="0.79" | 790 m || 
|-id=403 bgcolor=#d6d6d6
| 290403 ||  || — || October 1, 2005 || Kitt Peak || Spacewatch || KOR || align=right | 1.6 km || 
|-id=404 bgcolor=#d6d6d6
| 290404 ||  || — || October 1, 2005 || Mount Lemmon || Mount Lemmon Survey || — || align=right | 2.4 km || 
|-id=405 bgcolor=#E9E9E9
| 290405 ||  || — || October 1, 2005 || Catalina || CSS || MAR || align=right | 1.3 km || 
|-id=406 bgcolor=#d6d6d6
| 290406 ||  || — || October 1, 2005 || Kitt Peak || Spacewatch || KOR || align=right | 1.8 km || 
|-id=407 bgcolor=#fefefe
| 290407 ||  || — || October 1, 2005 || Mount Lemmon || Mount Lemmon Survey || — || align=right | 1.3 km || 
|-id=408 bgcolor=#fefefe
| 290408 ||  || — || October 5, 2005 || Socorro || LINEAR || NYS || align=right data-sort-value="0.76" | 760 m || 
|-id=409 bgcolor=#d6d6d6
| 290409 ||  || — || October 6, 2005 || Bergisch Gladbach || W. Bickel || — || align=right | 2.4 km || 
|-id=410 bgcolor=#E9E9E9
| 290410 ||  || — || October 6, 2005 || Mount Lemmon || Mount Lemmon Survey || — || align=right | 3.2 km || 
|-id=411 bgcolor=#fefefe
| 290411 ||  || — || October 8, 2005 || Moletai || K. Černis, J. Zdanavičius || NYS || align=right data-sort-value="0.59" | 590 m || 
|-id=412 bgcolor=#d6d6d6
| 290412 ||  || — || October 5, 2005 || Kitt Peak || Spacewatch || EOS || align=right | 2.7 km || 
|-id=413 bgcolor=#d6d6d6
| 290413 ||  || — || October 6, 2005 || Kitt Peak || Spacewatch || EOS || align=right | 2.8 km || 
|-id=414 bgcolor=#E9E9E9
| 290414 ||  || — || October 1, 2005 || Mount Lemmon || Mount Lemmon Survey || PAD || align=right | 2.1 km || 
|-id=415 bgcolor=#d6d6d6
| 290415 ||  || — || October 1, 2005 || Mount Lemmon || Mount Lemmon Survey || — || align=right | 2.2 km || 
|-id=416 bgcolor=#d6d6d6
| 290416 ||  || — || October 3, 2005 || Kitt Peak || Spacewatch || — || align=right | 2.9 km || 
|-id=417 bgcolor=#E9E9E9
| 290417 ||  || — || October 4, 2005 || Mount Lemmon || Mount Lemmon Survey || — || align=right | 1.1 km || 
|-id=418 bgcolor=#E9E9E9
| 290418 ||  || — || October 6, 2005 || Anderson Mesa || LONEOS || — || align=right | 2.4 km || 
|-id=419 bgcolor=#d6d6d6
| 290419 ||  || — || October 6, 2005 || Mount Lemmon || Mount Lemmon Survey || — || align=right | 2.6 km || 
|-id=420 bgcolor=#E9E9E9
| 290420 ||  || — || October 3, 2005 || Kitt Peak || Spacewatch || HOF || align=right | 3.0 km || 
|-id=421 bgcolor=#E9E9E9
| 290421 ||  || — || October 5, 2005 || Catalina || CSS || RAF || align=right | 1.2 km || 
|-id=422 bgcolor=#fefefe
| 290422 ||  || — || October 6, 2005 || Anderson Mesa || LONEOS || NYS || align=right data-sort-value="0.79" | 790 m || 
|-id=423 bgcolor=#d6d6d6
| 290423 ||  || — || October 7, 2005 || Kitt Peak || Spacewatch || KOR || align=right | 1.3 km || 
|-id=424 bgcolor=#d6d6d6
| 290424 ||  || — || October 3, 2005 || Kitt Peak || Spacewatch || HYG || align=right | 3.4 km || 
|-id=425 bgcolor=#fefefe
| 290425 ||  || — || October 3, 2005 || Kitt Peak || Spacewatch || — || align=right data-sort-value="0.89" | 890 m || 
|-id=426 bgcolor=#d6d6d6
| 290426 ||  || — || October 6, 2005 || Anderson Mesa || LONEOS || — || align=right | 3.6 km || 
|-id=427 bgcolor=#d6d6d6
| 290427 ||  || — || October 6, 2005 || Kitt Peak || Spacewatch || — || align=right | 4.1 km || 
|-id=428 bgcolor=#d6d6d6
| 290428 ||  || — || October 6, 2005 || Mount Lemmon || Mount Lemmon Survey || — || align=right | 2.3 km || 
|-id=429 bgcolor=#fefefe
| 290429 ||  || — || October 6, 2005 || Mount Lemmon || Mount Lemmon Survey || — || align=right | 1.0 km || 
|-id=430 bgcolor=#E9E9E9
| 290430 ||  || — || October 6, 2005 || Anderson Mesa || LONEOS || — || align=right | 3.2 km || 
|-id=431 bgcolor=#fefefe
| 290431 ||  || — || October 7, 2005 || Kitt Peak || Spacewatch || — || align=right data-sort-value="0.85" | 850 m || 
|-id=432 bgcolor=#E9E9E9
| 290432 ||  || — || October 7, 2005 || Mount Lemmon || Mount Lemmon Survey || — || align=right | 1.9 km || 
|-id=433 bgcolor=#E9E9E9
| 290433 ||  || — || October 7, 2005 || Kitt Peak || Spacewatch || AGN || align=right | 1.4 km || 
|-id=434 bgcolor=#E9E9E9
| 290434 ||  || — || October 7, 2005 || Kitt Peak || Spacewatch || — || align=right | 1.6 km || 
|-id=435 bgcolor=#E9E9E9
| 290435 ||  || — || October 7, 2005 || Kitt Peak || Spacewatch || HOF || align=right | 3.2 km || 
|-id=436 bgcolor=#E9E9E9
| 290436 ||  || — || October 7, 2005 || Kitt Peak || Spacewatch || HNA || align=right | 2.2 km || 
|-id=437 bgcolor=#E9E9E9
| 290437 ||  || — || October 7, 2005 || Kitt Peak || Spacewatch || — || align=right | 2.0 km || 
|-id=438 bgcolor=#fefefe
| 290438 ||  || — || October 7, 2005 || Kitt Peak || Spacewatch || NYS || align=right data-sort-value="0.71" | 710 m || 
|-id=439 bgcolor=#d6d6d6
| 290439 ||  || — || October 7, 2005 || Kitt Peak || Spacewatch || CHA || align=right | 2.1 km || 
|-id=440 bgcolor=#fefefe
| 290440 ||  || — || October 7, 2005 || Kitt Peak || Spacewatch || NYS || align=right data-sort-value="0.67" | 670 m || 
|-id=441 bgcolor=#E9E9E9
| 290441 ||  || — || October 7, 2005 || Kitt Peak || Spacewatch || HOF || align=right | 2.8 km || 
|-id=442 bgcolor=#d6d6d6
| 290442 ||  || — || October 7, 2005 || Kitt Peak || Spacewatch || — || align=right | 2.8 km || 
|-id=443 bgcolor=#d6d6d6
| 290443 ||  || — || October 7, 2005 || Kitt Peak || Spacewatch || — || align=right | 2.5 km || 
|-id=444 bgcolor=#d6d6d6
| 290444 ||  || — || October 7, 2005 || Kitt Peak || Spacewatch || — || align=right | 2.9 km || 
|-id=445 bgcolor=#E9E9E9
| 290445 ||  || — || October 7, 2005 || Kitt Peak || Spacewatch || — || align=right | 2.2 km || 
|-id=446 bgcolor=#d6d6d6
| 290446 ||  || — || October 7, 2005 || Kitt Peak || Spacewatch || KOR || align=right | 1.4 km || 
|-id=447 bgcolor=#d6d6d6
| 290447 ||  || — || October 7, 2005 || Kitt Peak || Spacewatch || — || align=right | 4.4 km || 
|-id=448 bgcolor=#d6d6d6
| 290448 ||  || — || October 6, 2005 || Kitt Peak || Spacewatch || THM || align=right | 2.6 km || 
|-id=449 bgcolor=#fefefe
| 290449 ||  || — || October 8, 2005 || Kitt Peak || Spacewatch || — || align=right data-sort-value="0.85" | 850 m || 
|-id=450 bgcolor=#d6d6d6
| 290450 ||  || — || October 8, 2005 || Kitt Peak || Spacewatch || HYG || align=right | 2.9 km || 
|-id=451 bgcolor=#d6d6d6
| 290451 ||  || — || October 10, 2005 || Kitt Peak || Spacewatch || — || align=right | 4.0 km || 
|-id=452 bgcolor=#d6d6d6
| 290452 ||  || — || October 5, 2005 || Catalina || CSS || — || align=right | 5.8 km || 
|-id=453 bgcolor=#E9E9E9
| 290453 ||  || — || October 9, 2005 || Kitt Peak || Spacewatch || AGN || align=right | 1.6 km || 
|-id=454 bgcolor=#E9E9E9
| 290454 ||  || — || October 9, 2005 || Kitt Peak || Spacewatch || — || align=right | 2.5 km || 
|-id=455 bgcolor=#d6d6d6
| 290455 ||  || — || October 9, 2005 || Kitt Peak || Spacewatch || 615 || align=right | 1.5 km || 
|-id=456 bgcolor=#d6d6d6
| 290456 ||  || — || October 9, 2005 || Kitt Peak || Spacewatch || — || align=right | 3.1 km || 
|-id=457 bgcolor=#fefefe
| 290457 ||  || — || October 9, 2005 || Kitt Peak || Spacewatch || NYS || align=right | 1.4 km || 
|-id=458 bgcolor=#E9E9E9
| 290458 ||  || — || October 9, 2005 || Kitt Peak || Spacewatch || — || align=right | 2.7 km || 
|-id=459 bgcolor=#E9E9E9
| 290459 ||  || — || October 9, 2005 || Kitt Peak || Spacewatch || ADE || align=right | 2.7 km || 
|-id=460 bgcolor=#E9E9E9
| 290460 ||  || — || October 9, 2005 || Kitt Peak || Spacewatch || — || align=right | 1.7 km || 
|-id=461 bgcolor=#d6d6d6
| 290461 ||  || — || October 9, 2005 || Kitt Peak || Spacewatch || — || align=right | 4.4 km || 
|-id=462 bgcolor=#d6d6d6
| 290462 ||  || — || October 9, 2005 || Kitt Peak || Spacewatch || — || align=right | 3.2 km || 
|-id=463 bgcolor=#E9E9E9
| 290463 ||  || — || October 9, 2005 || Kitt Peak || Spacewatch || AGN || align=right | 1.5 km || 
|-id=464 bgcolor=#E9E9E9
| 290464 ||  || — || October 10, 2005 || Goodricke-Pigott || R. A. Tucker || AGN || align=right | 1.7 km || 
|-id=465 bgcolor=#d6d6d6
| 290465 ||  || — || October 10, 2005 || Anderson Mesa || LONEOS || — || align=right | 4.8 km || 
|-id=466 bgcolor=#E9E9E9
| 290466 ||  || — || October 10, 2005 || Kitt Peak || Spacewatch || — || align=right | 1.7 km || 
|-id=467 bgcolor=#E9E9E9
| 290467 ||  || — || October 13, 2005 || Socorro || LINEAR || — || align=right | 1.9 km || 
|-id=468 bgcolor=#E9E9E9
| 290468 ||  || — || October 3, 2005 || Catalina || CSS || — || align=right | 3.3 km || 
|-id=469 bgcolor=#d6d6d6
| 290469 ||  || — || October 1, 2005 || Kitt Peak || Spacewatch || HIL3:2 || align=right | 4.4 km || 
|-id=470 bgcolor=#d6d6d6
| 290470 ||  || — || October 1, 2005 || Kitt Peak || Spacewatch || THM || align=right | 2.9 km || 
|-id=471 bgcolor=#E9E9E9
| 290471 ||  || — || October 1, 2005 || Mount Lemmon || Mount Lemmon Survey || HOF || align=right | 3.1 km || 
|-id=472 bgcolor=#fefefe
| 290472 ||  || — || October 2, 2005 || Palomar || NEAT || — || align=right | 1.4 km || 
|-id=473 bgcolor=#fefefe
| 290473 ||  || — || October 7, 2005 || Kitt Peak || Spacewatch || — || align=right data-sort-value="0.66" | 660 m || 
|-id=474 bgcolor=#E9E9E9
| 290474 ||  || — || October 9, 2005 || Kitt Peak || Spacewatch || — || align=right | 1.8 km || 
|-id=475 bgcolor=#d6d6d6
| 290475 ||  || — || October 13, 2005 || Kitt Peak || Spacewatch || — || align=right | 3.3 km || 
|-id=476 bgcolor=#d6d6d6
| 290476 ||  || — || October 1, 2005 || Kitt Peak || Spacewatch || HYG || align=right | 2.8 km || 
|-id=477 bgcolor=#E9E9E9
| 290477 ||  || — || October 1, 2005 || Mount Lemmon || Mount Lemmon Survey || — || align=right | 1.6 km || 
|-id=478 bgcolor=#d6d6d6
| 290478 ||  || — || October 8, 2005 || Catalina || CSS || — || align=right | 3.6 km || 
|-id=479 bgcolor=#E9E9E9
| 290479 ||  || — || October 10, 2005 || Anderson Mesa || LONEOS || — || align=right | 3.1 km || 
|-id=480 bgcolor=#E9E9E9
| 290480 ||  || — || October 11, 2005 || Apache Point || A. C. Becker || — || align=right | 2.0 km || 
|-id=481 bgcolor=#d6d6d6
| 290481 ||  || — || October 1, 2005 || Mount Lemmon || Mount Lemmon Survey || — || align=right | 2.3 km || 
|-id=482 bgcolor=#E9E9E9
| 290482 ||  || — || October 1, 2005 || Mount Lemmon || Mount Lemmon Survey || AST || align=right | 1.8 km || 
|-id=483 bgcolor=#d6d6d6
| 290483 ||  || — || October 1, 2005 || Mount Lemmon || Mount Lemmon Survey || — || align=right | 3.3 km || 
|-id=484 bgcolor=#d6d6d6
| 290484 ||  || — || October 1, 2005 || Kitt Peak || Spacewatch || KOR || align=right | 1.4 km || 
|-id=485 bgcolor=#d6d6d6
| 290485 ||  || — || October 1, 2005 || Anderson Mesa || LONEOS || — || align=right | 3.9 km || 
|-id=486 bgcolor=#E9E9E9
| 290486 ||  || — || October 22, 2005 || Junk Bond || D. Healy || — || align=right | 2.7 km || 
|-id=487 bgcolor=#E9E9E9
| 290487 ||  || — || October 25, 2005 || Goodricke-Pigott || R. A. Tucker || — || align=right | 3.5 km || 
|-id=488 bgcolor=#fefefe
| 290488 ||  || — || October 27, 2005 || Altschwendt || Altschwendt Obs. || — || align=right data-sort-value="0.78" | 780 m || 
|-id=489 bgcolor=#d6d6d6
| 290489 ||  || — || October 21, 2005 || Palomar || NEAT || — || align=right | 3.6 km || 
|-id=490 bgcolor=#d6d6d6
| 290490 ||  || — || October 22, 2005 || Kitt Peak || Spacewatch || — || align=right | 3.0 km || 
|-id=491 bgcolor=#d6d6d6
| 290491 ||  || — || October 22, 2005 || Kitt Peak || Spacewatch || KOR || align=right | 1.6 km || 
|-id=492 bgcolor=#d6d6d6
| 290492 ||  || — || October 22, 2005 || Kitt Peak || Spacewatch || — || align=right | 2.5 km || 
|-id=493 bgcolor=#E9E9E9
| 290493 ||  || — || October 22, 2005 || Kitt Peak || Spacewatch || — || align=right | 1.3 km || 
|-id=494 bgcolor=#E9E9E9
| 290494 ||  || — || October 22, 2005 || Kitt Peak || Spacewatch || — || align=right | 2.0 km || 
|-id=495 bgcolor=#E9E9E9
| 290495 ||  || — || October 22, 2005 || Catalina || CSS || — || align=right | 3.0 km || 
|-id=496 bgcolor=#E9E9E9
| 290496 ||  || — || October 22, 2005 || Catalina || CSS || — || align=right | 1.9 km || 
|-id=497 bgcolor=#d6d6d6
| 290497 ||  || — || October 22, 2005 || Kitt Peak || Spacewatch || EUP || align=right | 4.2 km || 
|-id=498 bgcolor=#d6d6d6
| 290498 ||  || — || October 23, 2005 || Kitt Peak || Spacewatch || — || align=right | 4.3 km || 
|-id=499 bgcolor=#E9E9E9
| 290499 ||  || — || October 23, 2005 || Kitt Peak || Spacewatch || HOF || align=right | 3.4 km || 
|-id=500 bgcolor=#d6d6d6
| 290500 ||  || — || October 23, 2005 || Kitt Peak || Spacewatch || — || align=right | 5.4 km || 
|}

290501–290600 

|-bgcolor=#d6d6d6
| 290501 ||  || — || October 23, 2005 || Kitt Peak || Spacewatch || — || align=right | 3.7 km || 
|-id=502 bgcolor=#d6d6d6
| 290502 ||  || — || October 23, 2005 || Kitt Peak || Spacewatch || — || align=right | 3.3 km || 
|-id=503 bgcolor=#d6d6d6
| 290503 ||  || — || October 23, 2005 || Catalina || CSS || — || align=right | 2.0 km || 
|-id=504 bgcolor=#d6d6d6
| 290504 ||  || — || October 23, 2005 || Kitt Peak || Spacewatch || — || align=right | 4.1 km || 
|-id=505 bgcolor=#fefefe
| 290505 ||  || — || October 23, 2005 || Kitt Peak || Spacewatch || — || align=right data-sort-value="0.79" | 790 m || 
|-id=506 bgcolor=#fefefe
| 290506 ||  || — || October 23, 2005 || Catalina || CSS || — || align=right data-sort-value="0.87" | 870 m || 
|-id=507 bgcolor=#d6d6d6
| 290507 ||  || — || October 23, 2005 || Catalina || CSS || — || align=right | 2.9 km || 
|-id=508 bgcolor=#fefefe
| 290508 ||  || — || October 24, 2005 || Kitt Peak || Spacewatch || MAS || align=right data-sort-value="0.87" | 870 m || 
|-id=509 bgcolor=#E9E9E9
| 290509 ||  || — || October 24, 2005 || Kitt Peak || Spacewatch || — || align=right data-sort-value="0.78" | 780 m || 
|-id=510 bgcolor=#fefefe
| 290510 ||  || — || October 24, 2005 || Kitt Peak || Spacewatch || NYS || align=right data-sort-value="0.54" | 540 m || 
|-id=511 bgcolor=#d6d6d6
| 290511 ||  || — || October 24, 2005 || Kitt Peak || Spacewatch || — || align=right | 4.3 km || 
|-id=512 bgcolor=#d6d6d6
| 290512 ||  || — || October 24, 2005 || Kitt Peak || Spacewatch || KOR || align=right | 1.3 km || 
|-id=513 bgcolor=#d6d6d6
| 290513 ||  || — || October 24, 2005 || Kitt Peak || Spacewatch || THM || align=right | 2.8 km || 
|-id=514 bgcolor=#E9E9E9
| 290514 ||  || — || October 24, 2005 || Kitt Peak || Spacewatch || — || align=right | 1.9 km || 
|-id=515 bgcolor=#E9E9E9
| 290515 ||  || — || October 24, 2005 || Kitt Peak || Spacewatch || WIT || align=right | 1.3 km || 
|-id=516 bgcolor=#E9E9E9
| 290516 ||  || — || October 24, 2005 || Kitt Peak || Spacewatch || AST || align=right | 1.9 km || 
|-id=517 bgcolor=#fefefe
| 290517 ||  || — || October 24, 2005 || Kitt Peak || Spacewatch || — || align=right data-sort-value="0.67" | 670 m || 
|-id=518 bgcolor=#E9E9E9
| 290518 ||  || — || October 24, 2005 || Kitt Peak || Spacewatch || — || align=right | 1.8 km || 
|-id=519 bgcolor=#d6d6d6
| 290519 ||  || — || October 24, 2005 || Kitt Peak || Spacewatch || — || align=right | 2.1 km || 
|-id=520 bgcolor=#fefefe
| 290520 ||  || — || October 25, 2005 || Kitt Peak || Spacewatch || NYS || align=right data-sort-value="0.87" | 870 m || 
|-id=521 bgcolor=#fefefe
| 290521 ||  || — || October 21, 2005 || Palomar || NEAT || EUT || align=right data-sort-value="0.75" | 750 m || 
|-id=522 bgcolor=#d6d6d6
| 290522 ||  || — || October 22, 2005 || Kitt Peak || Spacewatch || URS || align=right | 3.2 km || 
|-id=523 bgcolor=#d6d6d6
| 290523 ||  || — || October 22, 2005 || Kitt Peak || Spacewatch || CHA || align=right | 2.6 km || 
|-id=524 bgcolor=#d6d6d6
| 290524 ||  || — || October 22, 2005 || Kitt Peak || Spacewatch || — || align=right | 3.8 km || 
|-id=525 bgcolor=#E9E9E9
| 290525 ||  || — || October 22, 2005 || Kitt Peak || Spacewatch || — || align=right | 1.5 km || 
|-id=526 bgcolor=#E9E9E9
| 290526 ||  || — || October 22, 2005 || Kitt Peak || Spacewatch || — || align=right | 2.4 km || 
|-id=527 bgcolor=#E9E9E9
| 290527 ||  || — || October 22, 2005 || Kitt Peak || Spacewatch || NEM || align=right | 2.8 km || 
|-id=528 bgcolor=#E9E9E9
| 290528 ||  || — || October 22, 2005 || Catalina || CSS || XIZ || align=right | 1.7 km || 
|-id=529 bgcolor=#E9E9E9
| 290529 ||  || — || October 23, 2005 || Catalina || CSS || — || align=right | 3.2 km || 
|-id=530 bgcolor=#d6d6d6
| 290530 ||  || — || October 23, 2005 || Catalina || CSS || — || align=right | 4.3 km || 
|-id=531 bgcolor=#d6d6d6
| 290531 ||  || — || October 23, 2005 || Catalina || CSS || — || align=right | 4.0 km || 
|-id=532 bgcolor=#d6d6d6
| 290532 ||  || — || October 24, 2005 || Kitt Peak || Spacewatch || — || align=right | 3.3 km || 
|-id=533 bgcolor=#d6d6d6
| 290533 ||  || — || October 25, 2005 || Kitt Peak || Spacewatch || KOR || align=right | 1.3 km || 
|-id=534 bgcolor=#fefefe
| 290534 ||  || — || October 25, 2005 || Catalina || CSS || — || align=right | 1.1 km || 
|-id=535 bgcolor=#E9E9E9
| 290535 ||  || — || October 21, 2005 || Palomar || NEAT || — || align=right | 3.3 km || 
|-id=536 bgcolor=#E9E9E9
| 290536 ||  || — || October 22, 2005 || Catalina || CSS || — || align=right | 2.2 km || 
|-id=537 bgcolor=#E9E9E9
| 290537 ||  || — || October 23, 2005 || Palomar || NEAT || — || align=right | 2.7 km || 
|-id=538 bgcolor=#fefefe
| 290538 ||  || — || October 23, 2005 || Catalina || CSS || — || align=right | 1.1 km || 
|-id=539 bgcolor=#E9E9E9
| 290539 ||  || — || October 23, 2005 || Catalina || CSS || — || align=right | 3.3 km || 
|-id=540 bgcolor=#d6d6d6
| 290540 ||  || — || October 23, 2005 || Catalina || CSS || — || align=right | 4.7 km || 
|-id=541 bgcolor=#d6d6d6
| 290541 ||  || — || October 23, 2005 || Catalina || CSS || — || align=right | 2.8 km || 
|-id=542 bgcolor=#E9E9E9
| 290542 ||  || — || October 24, 2005 || Kitt Peak || Spacewatch || — || align=right | 2.6 km || 
|-id=543 bgcolor=#fefefe
| 290543 ||  || — || October 25, 2005 || Catalina || CSS || — || align=right | 1.3 km || 
|-id=544 bgcolor=#d6d6d6
| 290544 ||  || — || October 22, 2005 || Kitt Peak || Spacewatch || — || align=right | 2.8 km || 
|-id=545 bgcolor=#fefefe
| 290545 ||  || — || October 22, 2005 || Kitt Peak || Spacewatch || — || align=right data-sort-value="0.86" | 860 m || 
|-id=546 bgcolor=#E9E9E9
| 290546 ||  || — || October 22, 2005 || Kitt Peak || Spacewatch || AGN || align=right | 1.3 km || 
|-id=547 bgcolor=#E9E9E9
| 290547 ||  || — || October 22, 2005 || Kitt Peak || Spacewatch || INO || align=right | 1.9 km || 
|-id=548 bgcolor=#fefefe
| 290548 ||  || — || October 22, 2005 || Kitt Peak || Spacewatch || — || align=right data-sort-value="0.90" | 900 m || 
|-id=549 bgcolor=#d6d6d6
| 290549 ||  || — || October 22, 2005 || Kitt Peak || Spacewatch || — || align=right | 3.5 km || 
|-id=550 bgcolor=#d6d6d6
| 290550 ||  || — || October 22, 2005 || Kitt Peak || Spacewatch || — || align=right | 3.0 km || 
|-id=551 bgcolor=#E9E9E9
| 290551 ||  || — || October 22, 2005 || Kitt Peak || Spacewatch || — || align=right | 1.5 km || 
|-id=552 bgcolor=#d6d6d6
| 290552 ||  || — || October 22, 2005 || Kitt Peak || Spacewatch || — || align=right | 3.8 km || 
|-id=553 bgcolor=#d6d6d6
| 290553 ||  || — || October 22, 2005 || Kitt Peak || Spacewatch || — || align=right | 2.8 km || 
|-id=554 bgcolor=#E9E9E9
| 290554 ||  || — || October 22, 2005 || Kitt Peak || Spacewatch || — || align=right | 2.6 km || 
|-id=555 bgcolor=#fefefe
| 290555 ||  || — || October 22, 2005 || Kitt Peak || Spacewatch || — || align=right data-sort-value="0.68" | 680 m || 
|-id=556 bgcolor=#d6d6d6
| 290556 ||  || — || October 22, 2005 || Kitt Peak || Spacewatch || — || align=right | 2.8 km || 
|-id=557 bgcolor=#d6d6d6
| 290557 ||  || — || October 22, 2005 || Kitt Peak || Spacewatch || — || align=right | 3.8 km || 
|-id=558 bgcolor=#d6d6d6
| 290558 ||  || — || October 22, 2005 || Kitt Peak || Spacewatch || — || align=right | 5.4 km || 
|-id=559 bgcolor=#d6d6d6
| 290559 ||  || — || October 22, 2005 || Palomar || NEAT || — || align=right | 3.5 km || 
|-id=560 bgcolor=#E9E9E9
| 290560 ||  || — || October 22, 2005 || Kitt Peak || Spacewatch || PAD || align=right | 2.0 km || 
|-id=561 bgcolor=#fefefe
| 290561 ||  || — || October 22, 2005 || Kitt Peak || Spacewatch || — || align=right | 2.0 km || 
|-id=562 bgcolor=#d6d6d6
| 290562 ||  || — || October 22, 2005 || Kitt Peak || Spacewatch || — || align=right | 4.0 km || 
|-id=563 bgcolor=#E9E9E9
| 290563 ||  || — || October 22, 2005 || Kitt Peak || Spacewatch || — || align=right | 2.0 km || 
|-id=564 bgcolor=#fefefe
| 290564 ||  || — || October 22, 2005 || Kitt Peak || Spacewatch || — || align=right data-sort-value="0.84" | 840 m || 
|-id=565 bgcolor=#d6d6d6
| 290565 ||  || — || October 22, 2005 || Kitt Peak || Spacewatch || — || align=right | 2.9 km || 
|-id=566 bgcolor=#fefefe
| 290566 ||  || — || October 23, 2005 || Kitt Peak || Spacewatch || — || align=right data-sort-value="0.72" | 720 m || 
|-id=567 bgcolor=#E9E9E9
| 290567 ||  || — || October 23, 2005 || Kitt Peak || Spacewatch || WIT || align=right | 1.2 km || 
|-id=568 bgcolor=#fefefe
| 290568 ||  || — || October 23, 2005 || Catalina || CSS || — || align=right data-sort-value="0.86" | 860 m || 
|-id=569 bgcolor=#d6d6d6
| 290569 ||  || — || October 24, 2005 || Kitt Peak || Spacewatch || K-2 || align=right | 1.5 km || 
|-id=570 bgcolor=#d6d6d6
| 290570 ||  || — || October 24, 2005 || Kitt Peak || Spacewatch || KAR || align=right | 1.3 km || 
|-id=571 bgcolor=#E9E9E9
| 290571 ||  || — || October 24, 2005 || Kitt Peak || Spacewatch || MRX || align=right | 1.7 km || 
|-id=572 bgcolor=#E9E9E9
| 290572 ||  || — || October 24, 2005 || Kitt Peak || Spacewatch || — || align=right data-sort-value="0.88" | 880 m || 
|-id=573 bgcolor=#d6d6d6
| 290573 ||  || — || October 24, 2005 || Kitt Peak || Spacewatch || — || align=right | 3.0 km || 
|-id=574 bgcolor=#fefefe
| 290574 ||  || — || October 24, 2005 || Kitt Peak || Spacewatch || — || align=right data-sort-value="0.92" | 920 m || 
|-id=575 bgcolor=#E9E9E9
| 290575 ||  || — || October 24, 2005 || Kitt Peak || Spacewatch || — || align=right | 1.7 km || 
|-id=576 bgcolor=#E9E9E9
| 290576 ||  || — || October 25, 2005 || Mount Lemmon || Mount Lemmon Survey || — || align=right | 2.4 km || 
|-id=577 bgcolor=#E9E9E9
| 290577 ||  || — || October 25, 2005 || Mount Lemmon || Mount Lemmon Survey || HEN || align=right data-sort-value="0.90" | 900 m || 
|-id=578 bgcolor=#d6d6d6
| 290578 ||  || — || October 25, 2005 || Kitt Peak || Spacewatch || — || align=right | 2.8 km || 
|-id=579 bgcolor=#d6d6d6
| 290579 ||  || — || October 26, 2005 || Kitt Peak || Spacewatch || — || align=right | 3.2 km || 
|-id=580 bgcolor=#E9E9E9
| 290580 ||  || — || October 26, 2005 || Kitt Peak || Spacewatch || — || align=right data-sort-value="0.98" | 980 m || 
|-id=581 bgcolor=#fefefe
| 290581 ||  || — || October 26, 2005 || Kitt Peak || Spacewatch || NYS || align=right data-sort-value="0.72" | 720 m || 
|-id=582 bgcolor=#E9E9E9
| 290582 ||  || — || October 26, 2005 || Kitt Peak || Spacewatch || — || align=right | 2.8 km || 
|-id=583 bgcolor=#E9E9E9
| 290583 ||  || — || October 26, 2005 || Kitt Peak || Spacewatch || CLO || align=right | 2.6 km || 
|-id=584 bgcolor=#fefefe
| 290584 ||  || — || October 26, 2005 || Kitt Peak || Spacewatch || FLO || align=right data-sort-value="0.77" | 770 m || 
|-id=585 bgcolor=#E9E9E9
| 290585 ||  || — || October 26, 2005 || Palomar || NEAT || — || align=right | 1.1 km || 
|-id=586 bgcolor=#d6d6d6
| 290586 ||  || — || October 26, 2005 || Anderson Mesa || LONEOS || TRP || align=right | 4.6 km || 
|-id=587 bgcolor=#E9E9E9
| 290587 ||  || — || October 26, 2005 || Palomar || NEAT || — || align=right | 4.0 km || 
|-id=588 bgcolor=#d6d6d6
| 290588 ||  || — || October 27, 2005 || Catalina || CSS || EOS || align=right | 2.9 km || 
|-id=589 bgcolor=#E9E9E9
| 290589 ||  || — || October 27, 2005 || Bergisch Gladbac || W. Bickel || WIT || align=right | 1.2 km || 
|-id=590 bgcolor=#fefefe
| 290590 ||  || — || October 23, 2005 || Kitt Peak || Spacewatch || — || align=right data-sort-value="0.71" | 710 m || 
|-id=591 bgcolor=#E9E9E9
| 290591 ||  || — || October 24, 2005 || Kitt Peak || Spacewatch || AGN || align=right | 1.1 km || 
|-id=592 bgcolor=#E9E9E9
| 290592 ||  || — || October 24, 2005 || Kitt Peak || Spacewatch || — || align=right | 1.4 km || 
|-id=593 bgcolor=#E9E9E9
| 290593 ||  || — || October 24, 2005 || Kitt Peak || Spacewatch || — || align=right | 2.0 km || 
|-id=594 bgcolor=#fefefe
| 290594 ||  || — || October 24, 2005 || Kitt Peak || Spacewatch || NYS || align=right data-sort-value="0.64" | 640 m || 
|-id=595 bgcolor=#E9E9E9
| 290595 ||  || — || October 24, 2005 || Kitt Peak || Spacewatch || — || align=right data-sort-value="0.88" | 880 m || 
|-id=596 bgcolor=#E9E9E9
| 290596 ||  || — || October 24, 2005 || Kitt Peak || Spacewatch || — || align=right | 2.4 km || 
|-id=597 bgcolor=#d6d6d6
| 290597 ||  || — || October 24, 2005 || Kitt Peak || Spacewatch || HYG || align=right | 2.9 km || 
|-id=598 bgcolor=#fefefe
| 290598 ||  || — || October 24, 2005 || Kitt Peak || Spacewatch || FLO || align=right data-sort-value="0.71" | 710 m || 
|-id=599 bgcolor=#d6d6d6
| 290599 ||  || — || October 24, 2005 || Kitt Peak || Spacewatch || — || align=right | 3.0 km || 
|-id=600 bgcolor=#E9E9E9
| 290600 ||  || — || October 27, 2005 || Mount Lemmon || Mount Lemmon Survey || AGN || align=right | 1.4 km || 
|}

290601–290700 

|-bgcolor=#E9E9E9
| 290601 ||  || — || October 22, 2005 || Kitt Peak || Spacewatch || HEN || align=right | 1.2 km || 
|-id=602 bgcolor=#fefefe
| 290602 ||  || — || October 22, 2005 || Kitt Peak || Spacewatch || — || align=right | 1.7 km || 
|-id=603 bgcolor=#E9E9E9
| 290603 ||  || — || October 22, 2005 || Kitt Peak || Spacewatch || — || align=right | 1.3 km || 
|-id=604 bgcolor=#d6d6d6
| 290604 ||  || — || October 24, 2005 || Kitt Peak || Spacewatch || — || align=right | 4.5 km || 
|-id=605 bgcolor=#d6d6d6
| 290605 ||  || — || October 25, 2005 || Kitt Peak || Spacewatch || — || align=right | 2.8 km || 
|-id=606 bgcolor=#E9E9E9
| 290606 ||  || — || October 25, 2005 || Kitt Peak || Spacewatch || HEN || align=right | 1.3 km || 
|-id=607 bgcolor=#d6d6d6
| 290607 ||  || — || October 25, 2005 || Kitt Peak || Spacewatch || — || align=right | 3.0 km || 
|-id=608 bgcolor=#d6d6d6
| 290608 ||  || — || October 26, 2005 || Kitt Peak || Spacewatch || — || align=right | 2.6 km || 
|-id=609 bgcolor=#E9E9E9
| 290609 ||  || — || October 12, 2005 || Kitt Peak || Spacewatch || HOF || align=right | 2.7 km || 
|-id=610 bgcolor=#E9E9E9
| 290610 ||  || — || October 27, 2005 || Kitt Peak || Spacewatch || — || align=right | 1.7 km || 
|-id=611 bgcolor=#E9E9E9
| 290611 ||  || — || October 25, 2005 || Kitt Peak || Spacewatch || WIT || align=right | 1.6 km || 
|-id=612 bgcolor=#d6d6d6
| 290612 ||  || — || October 26, 2005 || Kitt Peak || Spacewatch || — || align=right | 6.4 km || 
|-id=613 bgcolor=#E9E9E9
| 290613 ||  || — || October 24, 2005 || Kitt Peak || Spacewatch || — || align=right | 1.8 km || 
|-id=614 bgcolor=#d6d6d6
| 290614 ||  || — || October 25, 2005 || Kitt Peak || Spacewatch || VER || align=right | 4.4 km || 
|-id=615 bgcolor=#d6d6d6
| 290615 ||  || — || October 25, 2005 || Kitt Peak || Spacewatch || — || align=right | 2.7 km || 
|-id=616 bgcolor=#E9E9E9
| 290616 ||  || — || October 25, 2005 || Kitt Peak || Spacewatch || PAD || align=right | 1.9 km || 
|-id=617 bgcolor=#d6d6d6
| 290617 ||  || — || October 25, 2005 || Kitt Peak || Spacewatch || — || align=right | 4.4 km || 
|-id=618 bgcolor=#d6d6d6
| 290618 ||  || — || October 25, 2005 || Kitt Peak || Spacewatch || KOR || align=right | 1.7 km || 
|-id=619 bgcolor=#d6d6d6
| 290619 ||  || — || October 25, 2005 || Kitt Peak || Spacewatch || KOR || align=right | 1.4 km || 
|-id=620 bgcolor=#d6d6d6
| 290620 ||  || — || October 25, 2005 || Kitt Peak || Spacewatch || HYG || align=right | 3.8 km || 
|-id=621 bgcolor=#E9E9E9
| 290621 ||  || — || October 25, 2005 || Kitt Peak || Spacewatch || — || align=right | 1.5 km || 
|-id=622 bgcolor=#fefefe
| 290622 ||  || — || October 25, 2005 || Kitt Peak || Spacewatch || NYS || align=right data-sort-value="0.92" | 920 m || 
|-id=623 bgcolor=#E9E9E9
| 290623 ||  || — || October 25, 2005 || Mount Lemmon || Mount Lemmon Survey || — || align=right | 3.2 km || 
|-id=624 bgcolor=#fefefe
| 290624 ||  || — || October 25, 2005 || Kitt Peak || Spacewatch || FLO || align=right data-sort-value="0.60" | 600 m || 
|-id=625 bgcolor=#E9E9E9
| 290625 ||  || — || October 25, 2005 || Kitt Peak || Spacewatch || — || align=right | 1.6 km || 
|-id=626 bgcolor=#E9E9E9
| 290626 ||  || — || October 25, 2005 || Kitt Peak || Spacewatch || — || align=right | 1.5 km || 
|-id=627 bgcolor=#E9E9E9
| 290627 ||  || — || October 25, 2005 || Kitt Peak || Spacewatch || HOF || align=right | 2.6 km || 
|-id=628 bgcolor=#E9E9E9
| 290628 ||  || — || October 25, 2005 || Kitt Peak || Spacewatch || AEO || align=right | 1.3 km || 
|-id=629 bgcolor=#E9E9E9
| 290629 ||  || — || October 25, 2005 || Kitt Peak || Spacewatch || — || align=right | 1.1 km || 
|-id=630 bgcolor=#fefefe
| 290630 ||  || — || October 25, 2005 || Kitt Peak || Spacewatch || — || align=right | 2.1 km || 
|-id=631 bgcolor=#d6d6d6
| 290631 ||  || — || October 25, 2005 || Kitt Peak || Spacewatch || — || align=right | 3.9 km || 
|-id=632 bgcolor=#d6d6d6
| 290632 ||  || — || October 27, 2005 || Mount Lemmon || Mount Lemmon Survey || — || align=right | 4.1 km || 
|-id=633 bgcolor=#fefefe
| 290633 ||  || — || October 27, 2005 || Kitt Peak || Spacewatch || — || align=right data-sort-value="0.64" | 640 m || 
|-id=634 bgcolor=#E9E9E9
| 290634 ||  || — || October 28, 2005 || Mount Lemmon || Mount Lemmon Survey || AST || align=right | 1.8 km || 
|-id=635 bgcolor=#d6d6d6
| 290635 ||  || — || October 23, 2005 || Catalina || CSS || — || align=right | 3.2 km || 
|-id=636 bgcolor=#d6d6d6
| 290636 ||  || — || October 23, 2005 || Catalina || CSS || — || align=right | 2.8 km || 
|-id=637 bgcolor=#d6d6d6
| 290637 ||  || — || October 23, 2005 || Catalina || CSS || EOS || align=right | 2.7 km || 
|-id=638 bgcolor=#d6d6d6
| 290638 ||  || — || October 26, 2005 || Anderson Mesa || LONEOS || — || align=right | 4.7 km || 
|-id=639 bgcolor=#d6d6d6
| 290639 ||  || — || October 25, 2005 || Kitt Peak || Spacewatch || — || align=right | 3.2 km || 
|-id=640 bgcolor=#d6d6d6
| 290640 ||  || — || October 25, 2005 || Kitt Peak || Spacewatch || HYG || align=right | 2.9 km || 
|-id=641 bgcolor=#d6d6d6
| 290641 ||  || — || October 25, 2005 || Kitt Peak || Spacewatch || KAR || align=right | 1.3 km || 
|-id=642 bgcolor=#E9E9E9
| 290642 ||  || — || October 27, 2005 || Kitt Peak || Spacewatch || — || align=right | 2.0 km || 
|-id=643 bgcolor=#E9E9E9
| 290643 ||  || — || October 27, 2005 || Kitt Peak || Spacewatch || — || align=right | 2.4 km || 
|-id=644 bgcolor=#d6d6d6
| 290644 ||  || — || October 27, 2005 || Kitt Peak || Spacewatch || — || align=right | 3.6 km || 
|-id=645 bgcolor=#E9E9E9
| 290645 ||  || — || October 1, 2005 || Mount Lemmon || Mount Lemmon Survey || AST || align=right | 1.8 km || 
|-id=646 bgcolor=#E9E9E9
| 290646 ||  || — || October 24, 2005 || Kitt Peak || Spacewatch || — || align=right | 2.3 km || 
|-id=647 bgcolor=#d6d6d6
| 290647 ||  || — || October 24, 2005 || Kitt Peak || Spacewatch || — || align=right | 2.5 km || 
|-id=648 bgcolor=#E9E9E9
| 290648 ||  || — || October 24, 2005 || Kitt Peak || Spacewatch || — || align=right | 2.1 km || 
|-id=649 bgcolor=#d6d6d6
| 290649 ||  || — || October 24, 2005 || Kitt Peak || Spacewatch || — || align=right | 2.3 km || 
|-id=650 bgcolor=#E9E9E9
| 290650 ||  || — || October 24, 2005 || Kitt Peak || Spacewatch || — || align=right | 2.8 km || 
|-id=651 bgcolor=#d6d6d6
| 290651 ||  || — || October 26, 2005 || Kitt Peak || Spacewatch || — || align=right | 3.8 km || 
|-id=652 bgcolor=#E9E9E9
| 290652 ||  || — || October 26, 2005 || Kitt Peak || Spacewatch || PAD || align=right | 1.8 km || 
|-id=653 bgcolor=#E9E9E9
| 290653 ||  || — || October 26, 2005 || Kitt Peak || Spacewatch || — || align=right | 1.4 km || 
|-id=654 bgcolor=#fefefe
| 290654 ||  || — || October 26, 2005 || Kitt Peak || Spacewatch || NYS || align=right data-sort-value="0.80" | 800 m || 
|-id=655 bgcolor=#E9E9E9
| 290655 ||  || — || October 26, 2005 || Kitt Peak || Spacewatch || — || align=right data-sort-value="0.93" | 930 m || 
|-id=656 bgcolor=#fefefe
| 290656 ||  || — || October 26, 2005 || Kitt Peak || Spacewatch || NYS || align=right data-sort-value="0.62" | 620 m || 
|-id=657 bgcolor=#d6d6d6
| 290657 ||  || — || October 26, 2005 || Kitt Peak || Spacewatch || — || align=right | 2.7 km || 
|-id=658 bgcolor=#E9E9E9
| 290658 ||  || — || October 26, 2005 || Kitt Peak || Spacewatch || HEN || align=right | 1.2 km || 
|-id=659 bgcolor=#E9E9E9
| 290659 ||  || — || October 26, 2005 || Kitt Peak || Spacewatch || — || align=right | 1.2 km || 
|-id=660 bgcolor=#d6d6d6
| 290660 ||  || — || October 26, 2005 || Kitt Peak || Spacewatch || VER || align=right | 4.0 km || 
|-id=661 bgcolor=#d6d6d6
| 290661 ||  || — || October 26, 2005 || Kitt Peak || Spacewatch || THM || align=right | 1.9 km || 
|-id=662 bgcolor=#d6d6d6
| 290662 ||  || — || October 26, 2005 || Kitt Peak || Spacewatch || — || align=right | 2.4 km || 
|-id=663 bgcolor=#d6d6d6
| 290663 ||  || — || October 26, 2005 || Kitt Peak || Spacewatch || — || align=right | 3.2 km || 
|-id=664 bgcolor=#fefefe
| 290664 ||  || — || October 27, 2005 || Kitt Peak || Spacewatch || FLO || align=right data-sort-value="0.80" | 800 m || 
|-id=665 bgcolor=#fefefe
| 290665 ||  || — || October 27, 2005 || Mount Lemmon || Mount Lemmon Survey || MAS || align=right data-sort-value="0.78" | 780 m || 
|-id=666 bgcolor=#E9E9E9
| 290666 ||  || — || October 29, 2005 || Mount Lemmon || Mount Lemmon Survey || MRX || align=right | 1.1 km || 
|-id=667 bgcolor=#d6d6d6
| 290667 ||  || — || October 29, 2005 || Mount Lemmon || Mount Lemmon Survey || THM || align=right | 2.5 km || 
|-id=668 bgcolor=#fefefe
| 290668 ||  || — || October 29, 2005 || Catalina || CSS || MAS || align=right data-sort-value="0.85" | 850 m || 
|-id=669 bgcolor=#E9E9E9
| 290669 ||  || — || October 29, 2005 || Catalina || CSS || — || align=right | 3.2 km || 
|-id=670 bgcolor=#d6d6d6
| 290670 ||  || — || October 27, 2005 || Mount Lemmon || Mount Lemmon Survey || — || align=right | 2.6 km || 
|-id=671 bgcolor=#E9E9E9
| 290671 ||  || — || October 27, 2005 || Kitt Peak || Spacewatch || WIT || align=right | 1.3 km || 
|-id=672 bgcolor=#d6d6d6
| 290672 ||  || — || October 27, 2005 || Kitt Peak || Spacewatch || CRO || align=right | 5.5 km || 
|-id=673 bgcolor=#E9E9E9
| 290673 ||  || — || October 29, 2005 || Mount Lemmon || Mount Lemmon Survey || — || align=right | 1.3 km || 
|-id=674 bgcolor=#d6d6d6
| 290674 ||  || — || October 31, 2005 || Kitt Peak || Spacewatch || THM || align=right | 2.5 km || 
|-id=675 bgcolor=#d6d6d6
| 290675 ||  || — || October 31, 2005 || Kitt Peak || Spacewatch || KOR || align=right | 1.3 km || 
|-id=676 bgcolor=#E9E9E9
| 290676 ||  || — || October 31, 2005 || Kitt Peak || Spacewatch || PAD || align=right | 1.6 km || 
|-id=677 bgcolor=#fefefe
| 290677 ||  || — || October 31, 2005 || Mount Lemmon || Mount Lemmon Survey || — || align=right data-sort-value="0.88" | 880 m || 
|-id=678 bgcolor=#E9E9E9
| 290678 ||  || — || October 29, 2005 || Kitt Peak || Spacewatch || — || align=right | 2.8 km || 
|-id=679 bgcolor=#E9E9E9
| 290679 ||  || — || October 30, 2005 || Palomar || NEAT || — || align=right | 2.5 km || 
|-id=680 bgcolor=#d6d6d6
| 290680 ||  || — || October 31, 2005 || Kitt Peak || Spacewatch || TIR || align=right | 2.4 km || 
|-id=681 bgcolor=#d6d6d6
| 290681 ||  || — || October 28, 2005 || Catalina || CSS || — || align=right | 3.3 km || 
|-id=682 bgcolor=#E9E9E9
| 290682 ||  || — || October 29, 2005 || Catalina || CSS || — || align=right | 2.1 km || 
|-id=683 bgcolor=#d6d6d6
| 290683 ||  || — || October 29, 2005 || Catalina || CSS || — || align=right | 5.4 km || 
|-id=684 bgcolor=#d6d6d6
| 290684 ||  || — || October 29, 2005 || Catalina || CSS || EOS || align=right | 2.8 km || 
|-id=685 bgcolor=#d6d6d6
| 290685 ||  || — || October 29, 2005 || Socorro || LINEAR || TIR || align=right | 4.3 km || 
|-id=686 bgcolor=#d6d6d6
| 290686 ||  || — || October 29, 2005 || Catalina || CSS || — || align=right | 4.4 km || 
|-id=687 bgcolor=#d6d6d6
| 290687 ||  || — || October 27, 2005 || Kitt Peak || Spacewatch || — || align=right | 3.2 km || 
|-id=688 bgcolor=#E9E9E9
| 290688 ||  || — || October 27, 2005 || Kitt Peak || Spacewatch || — || align=right | 2.0 km || 
|-id=689 bgcolor=#E9E9E9
| 290689 ||  || — || October 27, 2005 || Kitt Peak || Spacewatch || — || align=right | 3.2 km || 
|-id=690 bgcolor=#E9E9E9
| 290690 ||  || — || October 27, 2005 || Kitt Peak || Spacewatch || HEN || align=right data-sort-value="0.99" | 990 m || 
|-id=691 bgcolor=#E9E9E9
| 290691 ||  || — || October 27, 2005 || Kitt Peak || Spacewatch || HOF || align=right | 3.7 km || 
|-id=692 bgcolor=#d6d6d6
| 290692 ||  || — || October 27, 2005 || Kitt Peak || Spacewatch || — || align=right | 2.9 km || 
|-id=693 bgcolor=#E9E9E9
| 290693 ||  || — || October 27, 2005 || Kitt Peak || Spacewatch || PAD || align=right | 2.1 km || 
|-id=694 bgcolor=#E9E9E9
| 290694 ||  || — || October 27, 2005 || Mount Lemmon || Mount Lemmon Survey || HEN || align=right data-sort-value="0.91" | 910 m || 
|-id=695 bgcolor=#fefefe
| 290695 ||  || — || October 27, 2005 || Mount Lemmon || Mount Lemmon Survey || — || align=right data-sort-value="0.69" | 690 m || 
|-id=696 bgcolor=#E9E9E9
| 290696 ||  || — || October 27, 2005 || Kitt Peak || Spacewatch || — || align=right | 2.4 km || 
|-id=697 bgcolor=#d6d6d6
| 290697 ||  || — || October 27, 2005 || Kitt Peak || Spacewatch || — || align=right | 2.8 km || 
|-id=698 bgcolor=#d6d6d6
| 290698 ||  || — || October 27, 2005 || Kitt Peak || Spacewatch || — || align=right | 2.2 km || 
|-id=699 bgcolor=#d6d6d6
| 290699 ||  || — || October 29, 2005 || Mount Lemmon || Mount Lemmon Survey || HYG || align=right | 2.8 km || 
|-id=700 bgcolor=#fefefe
| 290700 ||  || — || October 27, 2005 || Socorro || LINEAR || — || align=right data-sort-value="0.87" | 870 m || 
|}

290701–290800 

|-bgcolor=#E9E9E9
| 290701 ||  || — || October 27, 2005 || Kitt Peak || Spacewatch || — || align=right | 1.6 km || 
|-id=702 bgcolor=#d6d6d6
| 290702 ||  || — || October 30, 2005 || Mount Lemmon || Mount Lemmon Survey || ANF || align=right | 1.6 km || 
|-id=703 bgcolor=#fefefe
| 290703 ||  || — || October 29, 2005 || Mount Lemmon || Mount Lemmon Survey || — || align=right data-sort-value="0.70" | 700 m || 
|-id=704 bgcolor=#fefefe
| 290704 ||  || — || October 30, 2005 || Kitt Peak || Spacewatch || FLO || align=right data-sort-value="0.54" | 540 m || 
|-id=705 bgcolor=#d6d6d6
| 290705 ||  || — || October 30, 2005 || Kitt Peak || Spacewatch || KOR || align=right | 1.3 km || 
|-id=706 bgcolor=#d6d6d6
| 290706 ||  || — || October 27, 2005 || Anderson Mesa || LONEOS || — || align=right | 4.3 km || 
|-id=707 bgcolor=#d6d6d6
| 290707 ||  || — || October 28, 2005 || Kitt Peak || Spacewatch || — || align=right | 4.2 km || 
|-id=708 bgcolor=#fefefe
| 290708 ||  || — || October 29, 2005 || Kitt Peak || Spacewatch || V || align=right data-sort-value="0.71" | 710 m || 
|-id=709 bgcolor=#d6d6d6
| 290709 ||  || — || October 30, 2005 || Mount Lemmon || Mount Lemmon Survey || KOR || align=right | 1.2 km || 
|-id=710 bgcolor=#d6d6d6
| 290710 ||  || — || October 31, 2005 || Mount Lemmon || Mount Lemmon Survey || — || align=right | 2.6 km || 
|-id=711 bgcolor=#E9E9E9
| 290711 ||  || — || October 25, 2005 || Kitt Peak || Spacewatch || WIT || align=right data-sort-value="0.95" | 950 m || 
|-id=712 bgcolor=#d6d6d6
| 290712 ||  || — || October 25, 2005 || Kitt Peak || Spacewatch || SYL7:4 || align=right | 7.0 km || 
|-id=713 bgcolor=#d6d6d6
| 290713 ||  || — || October 25, 2005 || Kitt Peak || Spacewatch || TRE || align=right | 2.7 km || 
|-id=714 bgcolor=#fefefe
| 290714 ||  || — || October 25, 2005 || Kitt Peak || Spacewatch || — || align=right data-sort-value="0.89" | 890 m || 
|-id=715 bgcolor=#d6d6d6
| 290715 ||  || — || October 25, 2005 || Kitt Peak || Spacewatch || — || align=right | 2.9 km || 
|-id=716 bgcolor=#fefefe
| 290716 ||  || — || October 27, 2005 || Mount Lemmon || Mount Lemmon Survey || — || align=right data-sort-value="0.80" | 800 m || 
|-id=717 bgcolor=#fefefe
| 290717 ||  || — || October 28, 2005 || Kitt Peak || Spacewatch || FLO || align=right data-sort-value="0.51" | 510 m || 
|-id=718 bgcolor=#d6d6d6
| 290718 ||  || — || October 28, 2005 || Kitt Peak || Spacewatch || — || align=right | 3.6 km || 
|-id=719 bgcolor=#E9E9E9
| 290719 ||  || — || October 28, 2005 || Kitt Peak || Spacewatch || AER || align=right | 2.0 km || 
|-id=720 bgcolor=#fefefe
| 290720 ||  || — || October 28, 2005 || Kitt Peak || Spacewatch || — || align=right data-sort-value="0.75" | 750 m || 
|-id=721 bgcolor=#fefefe
| 290721 ||  || — || October 28, 2005 || Kitt Peak || Spacewatch || CLA || align=right | 1.8 km || 
|-id=722 bgcolor=#d6d6d6
| 290722 ||  || — || October 28, 2005 || Kitt Peak || Spacewatch || — || align=right | 4.4 km || 
|-id=723 bgcolor=#E9E9E9
| 290723 ||  || — || October 27, 2005 || Mount Lemmon || Mount Lemmon Survey || — || align=right | 3.1 km || 
|-id=724 bgcolor=#d6d6d6
| 290724 ||  || — || October 30, 2005 || Socorro || LINEAR || — || align=right | 4.6 km || 
|-id=725 bgcolor=#d6d6d6
| 290725 ||  || — || October 30, 2005 || Socorro || LINEAR || ALA || align=right | 6.0 km || 
|-id=726 bgcolor=#E9E9E9
| 290726 ||  || — || October 30, 2005 || Socorro || LINEAR || — || align=right | 3.6 km || 
|-id=727 bgcolor=#E9E9E9
| 290727 ||  || — || October 30, 2005 || Socorro || LINEAR || — || align=right | 1.6 km || 
|-id=728 bgcolor=#fefefe
| 290728 ||  || — || October 30, 2005 || Socorro || LINEAR || FLO || align=right data-sort-value="0.88" | 880 m || 
|-id=729 bgcolor=#fefefe
| 290729 ||  || — || October 30, 2005 || Mount Lemmon || Mount Lemmon Survey || — || align=right | 1.1 km || 
|-id=730 bgcolor=#d6d6d6
| 290730 ||  || — || October 31, 2005 || Kitt Peak || Spacewatch || EOS || align=right | 2.4 km || 
|-id=731 bgcolor=#d6d6d6
| 290731 ||  || — || October 29, 2005 || Catalina || CSS || — || align=right | 4.3 km || 
|-id=732 bgcolor=#fefefe
| 290732 ||  || — || October 29, 2005 || Catalina || CSS || V || align=right data-sort-value="0.85" | 850 m || 
|-id=733 bgcolor=#d6d6d6
| 290733 ||  || — || October 29, 2005 || Catalina || CSS || — || align=right | 4.8 km || 
|-id=734 bgcolor=#fefefe
| 290734 ||  || — || October 30, 2005 || Socorro || LINEAR || — || align=right | 1.2 km || 
|-id=735 bgcolor=#d6d6d6
| 290735 ||  || — || October 29, 2005 || Kitt Peak || Spacewatch || HYG || align=right | 3.4 km || 
|-id=736 bgcolor=#d6d6d6
| 290736 ||  || — || October 30, 2005 || Mount Lemmon || Mount Lemmon Survey || — || align=right | 3.4 km || 
|-id=737 bgcolor=#d6d6d6
| 290737 ||  || — || October 31, 2005 || Mount Lemmon || Mount Lemmon Survey || — || align=right | 4.3 km || 
|-id=738 bgcolor=#d6d6d6
| 290738 ||  || — || October 31, 2005 || Palomar || NEAT || — || align=right | 2.8 km || 
|-id=739 bgcolor=#d6d6d6
| 290739 ||  || — || October 30, 2005 || Kitt Peak || Spacewatch || KOR || align=right | 1.9 km || 
|-id=740 bgcolor=#E9E9E9
| 290740 ||  || — || October 30, 2005 || Kitt Peak || Spacewatch || — || align=right | 2.3 km || 
|-id=741 bgcolor=#E9E9E9
| 290741 ||  || — || October 30, 2005 || Kitt Peak || Spacewatch || — || align=right | 2.4 km || 
|-id=742 bgcolor=#d6d6d6
| 290742 ||  || — || October 30, 2005 || Kitt Peak || Spacewatch || HIL3:2 || align=right | 7.6 km || 
|-id=743 bgcolor=#fefefe
| 290743 ||  || — || October 30, 2005 || Kitt Peak || Spacewatch || — || align=right data-sort-value="0.99" | 990 m || 
|-id=744 bgcolor=#E9E9E9
| 290744 ||  || — || October 30, 2005 || Kitt Peak || Spacewatch || DOR || align=right | 2.7 km || 
|-id=745 bgcolor=#E9E9E9
| 290745 ||  || — || October 30, 2005 || Mount Lemmon || Mount Lemmon Survey || — || align=right | 1.7 km || 
|-id=746 bgcolor=#E9E9E9
| 290746 ||  || — || October 30, 2005 || Mount Lemmon || Mount Lemmon Survey || HOF || align=right | 2.8 km || 
|-id=747 bgcolor=#d6d6d6
| 290747 ||  || — || October 30, 2005 || Mount Lemmon || Mount Lemmon Survey || 3:2 || align=right | 5.1 km || 
|-id=748 bgcolor=#fefefe
| 290748 ||  || — || October 30, 2005 || Catalina || CSS || — || align=right | 1.2 km || 
|-id=749 bgcolor=#d6d6d6
| 290749 ||  || — || October 22, 2005 || Catalina || CSS || — || align=right | 2.3 km || 
|-id=750 bgcolor=#d6d6d6
| 290750 ||  || — || October 23, 2005 || Catalina || CSS || — || align=right | 5.6 km || 
|-id=751 bgcolor=#d6d6d6
| 290751 ||  || — || October 23, 2005 || Catalina || CSS || — || align=right | 3.9 km || 
|-id=752 bgcolor=#E9E9E9
| 290752 ||  || — || October 25, 2005 || Catalina || CSS || — || align=right | 1.5 km || 
|-id=753 bgcolor=#d6d6d6
| 290753 ||  || — || October 25, 2005 || Catalina || CSS || — || align=right | 2.9 km || 
|-id=754 bgcolor=#fefefe
| 290754 ||  || — || October 25, 2005 || Catalina || CSS || NYS || align=right data-sort-value="0.88" | 880 m || 
|-id=755 bgcolor=#d6d6d6
| 290755 ||  || — || October 25, 2005 || Catalina || CSS || — || align=right | 4.0 km || 
|-id=756 bgcolor=#d6d6d6
| 290756 ||  || — || October 27, 2005 || Anderson Mesa || LONEOS || HYG || align=right | 2.9 km || 
|-id=757 bgcolor=#d6d6d6
| 290757 ||  || — || October 27, 2005 || Palomar || NEAT || — || align=right | 3.3 km || 
|-id=758 bgcolor=#E9E9E9
| 290758 ||  || — || October 29, 2005 || Palomar || NEAT || JUN || align=right | 1.6 km || 
|-id=759 bgcolor=#fefefe
| 290759 ||  || — || October 24, 2005 || Mauna Kea || D. J. Tholen || V || align=right data-sort-value="0.82" | 820 m || 
|-id=760 bgcolor=#fefefe
| 290760 ||  || — || October 25, 2005 || Mount Lemmon || Mount Lemmon Survey || — || align=right data-sort-value="0.91" | 910 m || 
|-id=761 bgcolor=#fefefe
| 290761 ||  || — || October 26, 2005 || Kitt Peak || Spacewatch || — || align=right data-sort-value="0.71" | 710 m || 
|-id=762 bgcolor=#fefefe
| 290762 ||  || — || October 28, 2005 || Kitt Peak || Spacewatch || NYS || align=right data-sort-value="0.70" | 700 m || 
|-id=763 bgcolor=#fefefe
| 290763 ||  || — || October 30, 2005 || Mount Lemmon || Mount Lemmon Survey || — || align=right data-sort-value="0.95" | 950 m || 
|-id=764 bgcolor=#E9E9E9
| 290764 ||  || — || October 25, 2005 || Mount Lemmon || Mount Lemmon Survey || — || align=right | 2.4 km || 
|-id=765 bgcolor=#E9E9E9
| 290765 ||  || — || October 29, 2005 || Kitt Peak || Spacewatch || WIT || align=right data-sort-value="0.96" | 960 m || 
|-id=766 bgcolor=#fefefe
| 290766 ||  || — || October 20, 2005 || Apache Point || A. C. Becker || NYS || align=right data-sort-value="0.85" | 850 m || 
|-id=767 bgcolor=#E9E9E9
| 290767 ||  || — || October 20, 2005 || Apache Point || A. C. Becker || — || align=right | 1.7 km || 
|-id=768 bgcolor=#d6d6d6
| 290768 ||  || — || October 22, 2005 || Apache Point || A. C. Becker || ELF || align=right | 3.8 km || 
|-id=769 bgcolor=#d6d6d6
| 290769 ||  || — || October 25, 2005 || Apache Point || A. C. Becker || — || align=right | 3.2 km || 
|-id=770 bgcolor=#d6d6d6
| 290770 ||  || — || October 27, 2005 || Apache Point || A. C. Becker || — || align=right | 3.0 km || 
|-id=771 bgcolor=#E9E9E9
| 290771 ||  || — || October 25, 2005 || Mount Lemmon || Mount Lemmon Survey || AST || align=right | 1.7 km || 
|-id=772 bgcolor=#FFC2E0
| 290772 ||  || — || November 1, 2005 || Mount Lemmon || Mount Lemmon Survey || APO +1kmPHA || align=right | 1.1 km || 
|-id=773 bgcolor=#E9E9E9
| 290773 ||  || — || November 6, 2005 || Ottmarsheim || C. Rinner || GEF || align=right | 1.9 km || 
|-id=774 bgcolor=#E9E9E9
| 290774 ||  || — || November 6, 2005 || Ottmarsheim || C. Rinner || — || align=right | 1.3 km || 
|-id=775 bgcolor=#fefefe
| 290775 ||  || — || November 3, 2005 || Socorro || LINEAR || — || align=right | 1.0 km || 
|-id=776 bgcolor=#d6d6d6
| 290776 ||  || — || November 3, 2005 || Mount Lemmon || Mount Lemmon Survey || HYG || align=right | 2.8 km || 
|-id=777 bgcolor=#d6d6d6
| 290777 ||  || — || November 3, 2005 || Mount Lemmon || Mount Lemmon Survey || — || align=right | 3.1 km || 
|-id=778 bgcolor=#E9E9E9
| 290778 ||  || — || November 4, 2005 || Catalina || CSS || — || align=right | 2.6 km || 
|-id=779 bgcolor=#d6d6d6
| 290779 ||  || — || November 4, 2005 || Kitt Peak || Spacewatch || — || align=right | 4.6 km || 
|-id=780 bgcolor=#d6d6d6
| 290780 ||  || — || November 2, 2005 || Mount Lemmon || Mount Lemmon Survey || — || align=right | 3.9 km || 
|-id=781 bgcolor=#fefefe
| 290781 ||  || — || November 3, 2005 || Mount Lemmon || Mount Lemmon Survey || ERI || align=right | 2.1 km || 
|-id=782 bgcolor=#d6d6d6
| 290782 ||  || — || November 4, 2005 || Catalina || CSS || CRO || align=right | 4.7 km || 
|-id=783 bgcolor=#d6d6d6
| 290783 ||  || — || November 4, 2005 || Catalina || CSS || TEL || align=right | 2.1 km || 
|-id=784 bgcolor=#E9E9E9
| 290784 ||  || — || November 4, 2005 || Mount Lemmon || Mount Lemmon Survey || — || align=right | 2.4 km || 
|-id=785 bgcolor=#d6d6d6
| 290785 ||  || — || November 5, 2005 || Mount Lemmon || Mount Lemmon Survey || EOS || align=right | 2.4 km || 
|-id=786 bgcolor=#d6d6d6
| 290786 ||  || — || November 3, 2005 || Kitt Peak || Spacewatch || — || align=right | 3.2 km || 
|-id=787 bgcolor=#E9E9E9
| 290787 ||  || — || November 4, 2005 || Mount Lemmon || Mount Lemmon Survey || — || align=right | 2.4 km || 
|-id=788 bgcolor=#d6d6d6
| 290788 ||  || — || November 3, 2005 || Catalina || CSS || — || align=right | 5.5 km || 
|-id=789 bgcolor=#d6d6d6
| 290789 ||  || — || November 3, 2005 || Catalina || CSS || — || align=right | 3.8 km || 
|-id=790 bgcolor=#d6d6d6
| 290790 ||  || — || November 5, 2005 || Catalina || CSS || HYG || align=right | 3.0 km || 
|-id=791 bgcolor=#fefefe
| 290791 ||  || — || November 1, 2005 || Mount Lemmon || Mount Lemmon Survey || NYS || align=right data-sort-value="0.67" | 670 m || 
|-id=792 bgcolor=#d6d6d6
| 290792 ||  || — || November 1, 2005 || Mount Lemmon || Mount Lemmon Survey || 628 || align=right | 2.0 km || 
|-id=793 bgcolor=#E9E9E9
| 290793 ||  || — || November 1, 2005 || Mount Lemmon || Mount Lemmon Survey || — || align=right | 1.6 km || 
|-id=794 bgcolor=#E9E9E9
| 290794 ||  || — || November 1, 2005 || Mount Lemmon || Mount Lemmon Survey || AGN || align=right | 1.3 km || 
|-id=795 bgcolor=#fefefe
| 290795 ||  || — || November 1, 2005 || Mount Lemmon || Mount Lemmon Survey || NYS || align=right data-sort-value="0.82" | 820 m || 
|-id=796 bgcolor=#fefefe
| 290796 ||  || — || November 1, 2005 || Mount Lemmon || Mount Lemmon Survey || — || align=right | 1.1 km || 
|-id=797 bgcolor=#fefefe
| 290797 ||  || — || November 1, 2005 || Mount Lemmon || Mount Lemmon Survey || NYS || align=right data-sort-value="0.86" | 860 m || 
|-id=798 bgcolor=#d6d6d6
| 290798 ||  || — || November 6, 2005 || Anderson Mesa || LONEOS || — || align=right | 5.4 km || 
|-id=799 bgcolor=#d6d6d6
| 290799 ||  || — || November 3, 2005 || Socorro || LINEAR || — || align=right | 3.6 km || 
|-id=800 bgcolor=#E9E9E9
| 290800 ||  || — || November 3, 2005 || Mount Lemmon || Mount Lemmon Survey || WIT || align=right | 1.3 km || 
|}

290801–290900 

|-bgcolor=#fefefe
| 290801 ||  || — || November 6, 2005 || Kitt Peak || Spacewatch || — || align=right data-sort-value="0.73" | 730 m || 
|-id=802 bgcolor=#E9E9E9
| 290802 ||  || — || November 6, 2005 || Kitt Peak || Spacewatch || — || align=right | 1.6 km || 
|-id=803 bgcolor=#fefefe
| 290803 ||  || — || November 6, 2005 || Kitt Peak || Spacewatch || — || align=right data-sort-value="0.99" | 990 m || 
|-id=804 bgcolor=#d6d6d6
| 290804 ||  || — || November 6, 2005 || Kitt Peak || Spacewatch || — || align=right | 2.8 km || 
|-id=805 bgcolor=#d6d6d6
| 290805 ||  || — || November 6, 2005 || Mount Lemmon || Mount Lemmon Survey || — || align=right | 3.5 km || 
|-id=806 bgcolor=#fefefe
| 290806 ||  || — || November 6, 2005 || Catalina || CSS || NYS || align=right data-sort-value="0.96" | 960 m || 
|-id=807 bgcolor=#d6d6d6
| 290807 ||  || — || November 6, 2005 || Catalina || CSS || — || align=right | 4.5 km || 
|-id=808 bgcolor=#E9E9E9
| 290808 ||  || — || November 6, 2005 || Catalina || CSS || — || align=right | 2.8 km || 
|-id=809 bgcolor=#d6d6d6
| 290809 ||  || — || November 7, 2005 || Socorro || LINEAR || EOS || align=right | 2.3 km || 
|-id=810 bgcolor=#E9E9E9
| 290810 ||  || — || November 10, 2005 || Catalina || CSS || — || align=right | 2.7 km || 
|-id=811 bgcolor=#fefefe
| 290811 ||  || — || November 2, 2005 || Mount Lemmon || Mount Lemmon Survey || — || align=right data-sort-value="0.89" | 890 m || 
|-id=812 bgcolor=#d6d6d6
| 290812 ||  || — || November 1, 2005 || Kitt Peak || Spacewatch || — || align=right | 3.4 km || 
|-id=813 bgcolor=#E9E9E9
| 290813 ||  || — || November 2, 2005 || Catalina || CSS || — || align=right | 3.7 km || 
|-id=814 bgcolor=#fefefe
| 290814 ||  || — || November 5, 2005 || Mount Lemmon || Mount Lemmon Survey || V || align=right data-sort-value="0.76" | 760 m || 
|-id=815 bgcolor=#fefefe
| 290815 ||  || — || November 6, 2005 || Mount Lemmon || Mount Lemmon Survey || — || align=right | 1.0 km || 
|-id=816 bgcolor=#fefefe
| 290816 ||  || — || November 6, 2005 || Mount Lemmon || Mount Lemmon Survey || FLO || align=right | 1.4 km || 
|-id=817 bgcolor=#E9E9E9
| 290817 ||  || — || November 6, 2005 || Mount Lemmon || Mount Lemmon Survey || — || align=right | 1.6 km || 
|-id=818 bgcolor=#fefefe
| 290818 ||  || — || November 10, 2005 || Mount Lemmon || Mount Lemmon Survey || NYS || align=right | 1.5 km || 
|-id=819 bgcolor=#E9E9E9
| 290819 ||  || — || November 11, 2005 || Kitt Peak || Spacewatch || HOF || align=right | 3.6 km || 
|-id=820 bgcolor=#d6d6d6
| 290820 ||  || — || November 11, 2005 || Socorro || LINEAR || — || align=right | 4.6 km || 
|-id=821 bgcolor=#d6d6d6
| 290821 ||  || — || November 1, 2005 || Mount Lemmon || Mount Lemmon Survey || — || align=right | 4.0 km || 
|-id=822 bgcolor=#E9E9E9
| 290822 ||  || — || November 1, 2005 || Apache Point || A. C. Becker || — || align=right | 1.4 km || 
|-id=823 bgcolor=#fefefe
| 290823 ||  || — || November 1, 2005 || Apache Point || A. C. Becker || NYS || align=right data-sort-value="0.78" | 780 m || 
|-id=824 bgcolor=#E9E9E9
| 290824 ||  || — || November 1, 2005 || Apache Point || A. C. Becker || HOF || align=right | 2.7 km || 
|-id=825 bgcolor=#E9E9E9
| 290825 ||  || — || November 1, 2005 || Apache Point || A. C. Becker || — || align=right | 1.8 km || 
|-id=826 bgcolor=#E9E9E9
| 290826 ||  || — || November 1, 2005 || Apache Point || A. C. Becker || — || align=right | 2.1 km || 
|-id=827 bgcolor=#d6d6d6
| 290827 ||  || — || November 1, 2005 || Apache Point || A. C. Becker || EOS || align=right | 1.9 km || 
|-id=828 bgcolor=#d6d6d6
| 290828 ||  || — || November 1, 2005 || Apache Point || A. C. Becker || VER || align=right | 2.4 km || 
|-id=829 bgcolor=#d6d6d6
| 290829 ||  || — || November 1, 2005 || Apache Point || A. C. Becker || EOS || align=right | 1.8 km || 
|-id=830 bgcolor=#d6d6d6
| 290830 ||  || — || November 6, 2005 || Kitt Peak || Spacewatch || EOS || align=right | 2.0 km || 
|-id=831 bgcolor=#d6d6d6
| 290831 ||  || — || November 4, 2005 || Mount Lemmon || Mount Lemmon Survey || CHA || align=right | 2.9 km || 
|-id=832 bgcolor=#d6d6d6
| 290832 ||  || — || November 21, 2005 || Socorro || LINEAR || EUP || align=right | 5.9 km || 
|-id=833 bgcolor=#E9E9E9
| 290833 ||  || — || November 21, 2005 || Needville || M. Eastman, D. Wells || MAR || align=right | 1.4 km || 
|-id=834 bgcolor=#E9E9E9
| 290834 ||  || — || November 21, 2005 || Anderson Mesa || LONEOS || JUN || align=right | 1.8 km || 
|-id=835 bgcolor=#d6d6d6
| 290835 ||  || — || November 21, 2005 || Catalina || CSS || TIR || align=right | 5.0 km || 
|-id=836 bgcolor=#fefefe
| 290836 ||  || — || November 22, 2005 || Kitt Peak || Spacewatch || MAS || align=right data-sort-value="0.77" | 770 m || 
|-id=837 bgcolor=#E9E9E9
| 290837 ||  || — || November 22, 2005 || Kitt Peak || Spacewatch || — || align=right | 2.6 km || 
|-id=838 bgcolor=#d6d6d6
| 290838 ||  || — || November 22, 2005 || Kitt Peak || Spacewatch || — || align=right | 3.0 km || 
|-id=839 bgcolor=#fefefe
| 290839 ||  || — || November 22, 2005 || Kitt Peak || Spacewatch || — || align=right | 1.1 km || 
|-id=840 bgcolor=#fefefe
| 290840 ||  || — || November 24, 2005 || Palomar || NEAT || — || align=right | 1.1 km || 
|-id=841 bgcolor=#E9E9E9
| 290841 ||  || — || November 21, 2005 || Kitt Peak || Spacewatch || — || align=right | 1.7 km || 
|-id=842 bgcolor=#E9E9E9
| 290842 ||  || — || November 21, 2005 || Kitt Peak || Spacewatch || — || align=right | 1.2 km || 
|-id=843 bgcolor=#d6d6d6
| 290843 ||  || — || November 21, 2005 || Kitt Peak || Spacewatch || — || align=right | 4.0 km || 
|-id=844 bgcolor=#d6d6d6
| 290844 ||  || — || November 21, 2005 || Kitt Peak || Spacewatch || — || align=right | 4.6 km || 
|-id=845 bgcolor=#d6d6d6
| 290845 ||  || — || November 21, 2005 || Kitt Peak || Spacewatch || — || align=right | 2.8 km || 
|-id=846 bgcolor=#E9E9E9
| 290846 ||  || — || November 21, 2005 || Kitt Peak || Spacewatch || HOF || align=right | 3.2 km || 
|-id=847 bgcolor=#fefefe
| 290847 ||  || — || November 21, 2005 || Kitt Peak || Spacewatch || — || align=right data-sort-value="0.60" | 600 m || 
|-id=848 bgcolor=#E9E9E9
| 290848 ||  || — || November 21, 2005 || Kitt Peak || Spacewatch || — || align=right | 2.1 km || 
|-id=849 bgcolor=#d6d6d6
| 290849 ||  || — || November 21, 2005 || Kitt Peak || Spacewatch || KOR || align=right | 1.6 km || 
|-id=850 bgcolor=#d6d6d6
| 290850 ||  || — || November 21, 2005 || Kitt Peak || Spacewatch || INA || align=right | 4.6 km || 
|-id=851 bgcolor=#E9E9E9
| 290851 ||  || — || November 21, 2005 || Catalina || CSS || — || align=right | 2.9 km || 
|-id=852 bgcolor=#d6d6d6
| 290852 ||  || — || November 21, 2005 || Kitt Peak || Spacewatch || — || align=right | 2.6 km || 
|-id=853 bgcolor=#fefefe
| 290853 ||  || — || November 22, 2005 || Kitt Peak || Spacewatch || V || align=right data-sort-value="0.88" | 880 m || 
|-id=854 bgcolor=#E9E9E9
| 290854 ||  || — || November 22, 2005 || Kitt Peak || Spacewatch || — || align=right | 2.3 km || 
|-id=855 bgcolor=#d6d6d6
| 290855 ||  || — || November 21, 2005 || Kitt Peak || Spacewatch || THM || align=right | 3.7 km || 
|-id=856 bgcolor=#d6d6d6
| 290856 ||  || — || November 21, 2005 || Kitt Peak || Spacewatch || — || align=right | 2.5 km || 
|-id=857 bgcolor=#E9E9E9
| 290857 ||  || — || November 21, 2005 || Kitt Peak || Spacewatch || GEF || align=right | 1.7 km || 
|-id=858 bgcolor=#d6d6d6
| 290858 ||  || — || November 22, 2005 || Kitt Peak || Spacewatch || — || align=right | 3.1 km || 
|-id=859 bgcolor=#E9E9E9
| 290859 ||  || — || November 22, 2005 || Kitt Peak || Spacewatch || — || align=right | 2.7 km || 
|-id=860 bgcolor=#E9E9E9
| 290860 ||  || — || November 25, 2005 || Kitt Peak || Spacewatch || — || align=right | 2.6 km || 
|-id=861 bgcolor=#E9E9E9
| 290861 ||  || — || November 25, 2005 || Kitt Peak || Spacewatch || — || align=right | 2.1 km || 
|-id=862 bgcolor=#d6d6d6
| 290862 ||  || — || November 25, 2005 || Kitt Peak || Spacewatch || KOR || align=right | 1.5 km || 
|-id=863 bgcolor=#d6d6d6
| 290863 ||  || — || November 25, 2005 || Mount Lemmon || Mount Lemmon Survey || KOR || align=right | 1.4 km || 
|-id=864 bgcolor=#fefefe
| 290864 ||  || — || November 25, 2005 || Mount Lemmon || Mount Lemmon Survey || — || align=right data-sort-value="0.83" | 830 m || 
|-id=865 bgcolor=#E9E9E9
| 290865 ||  || — || November 25, 2005 || Kitt Peak || Spacewatch || WIT || align=right | 1.2 km || 
|-id=866 bgcolor=#d6d6d6
| 290866 ||  || — || November 28, 2005 || Junk Bond || D. Healy || — || align=right | 2.8 km || 
|-id=867 bgcolor=#fefefe
| 290867 ||  || — || November 25, 2005 || Kitt Peak || Spacewatch || FLO || align=right data-sort-value="0.83" | 830 m || 
|-id=868 bgcolor=#E9E9E9
| 290868 ||  || — || November 25, 2005 || Mount Lemmon || Mount Lemmon Survey || — || align=right | 2.0 km || 
|-id=869 bgcolor=#fefefe
| 290869 ||  || — || November 26, 2005 || Kitami || K. Endate || — || align=right | 1.1 km || 
|-id=870 bgcolor=#d6d6d6
| 290870 ||  || — || November 20, 2005 || Gnosca || S. Sposetti || — || align=right | 2.0 km || 
|-id=871 bgcolor=#d6d6d6
| 290871 ||  || — || November 26, 2005 || Cordell-Lorenz || Cordell–Lorenz Obs. || 3:2 || align=right | 7.6 km || 
|-id=872 bgcolor=#d6d6d6
| 290872 ||  || — || November 20, 2005 || Great Shefford || P. Birtwhistle || — || align=right | 4.1 km || 
|-id=873 bgcolor=#fefefe
| 290873 ||  || — || November 30, 2005 || Gnosca || S. Sposetti || MAS || align=right data-sort-value="0.90" | 900 m || 
|-id=874 bgcolor=#d6d6d6
| 290874 ||  || — || November 26, 2005 || Mount Lemmon || Mount Lemmon Survey || EOS || align=right | 2.8 km || 
|-id=875 bgcolor=#d6d6d6
| 290875 ||  || — || November 25, 2005 || Catalina || CSS || EOS || align=right | 2.1 km || 
|-id=876 bgcolor=#E9E9E9
| 290876 ||  || — || November 26, 2005 || Catalina || CSS || — || align=right | 3.2 km || 
|-id=877 bgcolor=#d6d6d6
| 290877 ||  || — || November 22, 2005 || Kitt Peak || Spacewatch || THM || align=right | 3.0 km || 
|-id=878 bgcolor=#d6d6d6
| 290878 ||  || — || November 25, 2005 || Mount Lemmon || Mount Lemmon Survey || THM || align=right | 2.5 km || 
|-id=879 bgcolor=#E9E9E9
| 290879 ||  || — || November 26, 2005 || Mount Lemmon || Mount Lemmon Survey || — || align=right | 1.1 km || 
|-id=880 bgcolor=#E9E9E9
| 290880 ||  || — || November 22, 2005 || Kitt Peak || Spacewatch || AGN || align=right | 1.7 km || 
|-id=881 bgcolor=#d6d6d6
| 290881 ||  || — || November 25, 2005 || Kitt Peak || Spacewatch || NAE || align=right | 3.7 km || 
|-id=882 bgcolor=#d6d6d6
| 290882 ||  || — || November 25, 2005 || Catalina || CSS || — || align=right | 3.9 km || 
|-id=883 bgcolor=#fefefe
| 290883 ||  || — || November 25, 2005 || Kitt Peak || Spacewatch || NYS || align=right data-sort-value="0.91" | 910 m || 
|-id=884 bgcolor=#fefefe
| 290884 ||  || — || November 25, 2005 || Kitt Peak || Spacewatch || — || align=right data-sort-value="0.71" | 710 m || 
|-id=885 bgcolor=#E9E9E9
| 290885 ||  || — || November 25, 2005 || Kitt Peak || Spacewatch || PAD || align=right | 1.8 km || 
|-id=886 bgcolor=#d6d6d6
| 290886 ||  || — || November 25, 2005 || Kitt Peak || Spacewatch || KOR || align=right | 1.8 km || 
|-id=887 bgcolor=#d6d6d6
| 290887 ||  || — || November 25, 2005 || Kitt Peak || Spacewatch || — || align=right | 4.1 km || 
|-id=888 bgcolor=#E9E9E9
| 290888 ||  || — || November 25, 2005 || Mount Lemmon || Mount Lemmon Survey || — || align=right | 2.8 km || 
|-id=889 bgcolor=#d6d6d6
| 290889 ||  || — || November 28, 2005 || Socorro || LINEAR || — || align=right | 3.2 km || 
|-id=890 bgcolor=#E9E9E9
| 290890 ||  || — || November 25, 2005 || Mount Lemmon || Mount Lemmon Survey || WIT || align=right | 1.2 km || 
|-id=891 bgcolor=#E9E9E9
| 290891 ||  || — || November 26, 2005 || Mount Lemmon || Mount Lemmon Survey || — || align=right | 2.2 km || 
|-id=892 bgcolor=#d6d6d6
| 290892 ||  || — || November 28, 2005 || Mount Lemmon || Mount Lemmon Survey || — || align=right | 2.6 km || 
|-id=893 bgcolor=#d6d6d6
| 290893 ||  || — || November 28, 2005 || Mount Lemmon || Mount Lemmon Survey || — || align=right | 2.7 km || 
|-id=894 bgcolor=#fefefe
| 290894 ||  || — || November 28, 2005 || Mount Lemmon || Mount Lemmon Survey || NYS || align=right data-sort-value="0.84" | 840 m || 
|-id=895 bgcolor=#d6d6d6
| 290895 ||  || — || November 28, 2005 || Mount Lemmon || Mount Lemmon Survey || — || align=right | 2.5 km || 
|-id=896 bgcolor=#d6d6d6
| 290896 ||  || — || November 28, 2005 || Mount Lemmon || Mount Lemmon Survey || THB || align=right | 4.2 km || 
|-id=897 bgcolor=#E9E9E9
| 290897 ||  || — || November 26, 2005 || Kitt Peak || Spacewatch || — || align=right | 1.3 km || 
|-id=898 bgcolor=#fefefe
| 290898 ||  || — || November 26, 2005 || Kitt Peak || Spacewatch || — || align=right data-sort-value="0.77" | 770 m || 
|-id=899 bgcolor=#d6d6d6
| 290899 ||  || — || November 26, 2005 || Kitt Peak || Spacewatch || K-2 || align=right | 1.5 km || 
|-id=900 bgcolor=#fefefe
| 290900 ||  || — || November 26, 2005 || Mount Lemmon || Mount Lemmon Survey || NYS || align=right data-sort-value="0.76" | 760 m || 
|}

290901–291000 

|-bgcolor=#d6d6d6
| 290901 ||  || — || November 26, 2005 || Kitt Peak || Spacewatch || — || align=right | 3.3 km || 
|-id=902 bgcolor=#d6d6d6
| 290902 ||  || — || November 28, 2005 || Kitt Peak || Spacewatch || THM || align=right | 2.7 km || 
|-id=903 bgcolor=#d6d6d6
| 290903 ||  || — || November 28, 2005 || Mount Lemmon || Mount Lemmon Survey || — || align=right | 3.0 km || 
|-id=904 bgcolor=#d6d6d6
| 290904 ||  || — || November 28, 2005 || Mount Lemmon || Mount Lemmon Survey || 7:4 || align=right | 6.6 km || 
|-id=905 bgcolor=#d6d6d6
| 290905 ||  || — || November 28, 2005 || Catalina || CSS || — || align=right | 3.7 km || 
|-id=906 bgcolor=#E9E9E9
| 290906 ||  || — || November 29, 2005 || Socorro || LINEAR || — || align=right | 2.3 km || 
|-id=907 bgcolor=#fefefe
| 290907 ||  || — || November 29, 2005 || Socorro || LINEAR || — || align=right | 1.0 km || 
|-id=908 bgcolor=#fefefe
| 290908 ||  || — || November 25, 2005 || Catalina || CSS || — || align=right | 1.2 km || 
|-id=909 bgcolor=#fefefe
| 290909 ||  || — || November 28, 2005 || Catalina || CSS || NYS || align=right data-sort-value="0.84" | 840 m || 
|-id=910 bgcolor=#d6d6d6
| 290910 ||  || — || November 28, 2005 || Catalina || CSS || 7:4 || align=right | 4.6 km || 
|-id=911 bgcolor=#E9E9E9
| 290911 ||  || — || November 29, 2005 || Catalina || CSS || — || align=right | 2.5 km || 
|-id=912 bgcolor=#E9E9E9
| 290912 ||  || — || November 25, 2005 || Mount Lemmon || Mount Lemmon Survey || — || align=right | 1.4 km || 
|-id=913 bgcolor=#d6d6d6
| 290913 ||  || — || November 30, 2005 || Kitt Peak || Spacewatch || — || align=right | 3.2 km || 
|-id=914 bgcolor=#E9E9E9
| 290914 ||  || — || November 28, 2005 || Kitt Peak || Spacewatch || PAD || align=right | 1.7 km || 
|-id=915 bgcolor=#d6d6d6
| 290915 ||  || — || November 28, 2005 || Mount Lemmon || Mount Lemmon Survey || — || align=right | 5.5 km || 
|-id=916 bgcolor=#E9E9E9
| 290916 ||  || — || November 28, 2005 || Socorro || LINEAR || — || align=right | 1.6 km || 
|-id=917 bgcolor=#E9E9E9
| 290917 ||  || — || November 28, 2005 || Mount Lemmon || Mount Lemmon Survey || WIT || align=right | 1.6 km || 
|-id=918 bgcolor=#fefefe
| 290918 ||  || — || November 28, 2005 || Socorro || LINEAR || — || align=right data-sort-value="0.83" | 830 m || 
|-id=919 bgcolor=#fefefe
| 290919 ||  || — || November 28, 2005 || Socorro || LINEAR || — || align=right data-sort-value="0.92" | 920 m || 
|-id=920 bgcolor=#d6d6d6
| 290920 ||  || — || November 30, 2005 || Eskridge || Farpoint Obs. || EOS || align=right | 2.8 km || 
|-id=921 bgcolor=#fefefe
| 290921 ||  || — || November 25, 2005 || Kitt Peak || Spacewatch || — || align=right data-sort-value="0.87" | 870 m || 
|-id=922 bgcolor=#E9E9E9
| 290922 ||  || — || November 28, 2005 || Catalina || CSS || MIS || align=right | 2.7 km || 
|-id=923 bgcolor=#E9E9E9
| 290923 ||  || — || November 25, 2005 || Mount Lemmon || Mount Lemmon Survey || HEN || align=right data-sort-value="0.97" | 970 m || 
|-id=924 bgcolor=#fefefe
| 290924 ||  || — || November 25, 2005 || Mount Lemmon || Mount Lemmon Survey || — || align=right data-sort-value="0.85" | 850 m || 
|-id=925 bgcolor=#d6d6d6
| 290925 ||  || — || November 25, 2005 || Mount Lemmon || Mount Lemmon Survey || THM || align=right | 1.9 km || 
|-id=926 bgcolor=#E9E9E9
| 290926 ||  || — || November 25, 2005 || Mount Lemmon || Mount Lemmon Survey || — || align=right | 1.1 km || 
|-id=927 bgcolor=#fefefe
| 290927 ||  || — || November 25, 2005 || Mount Lemmon || Mount Lemmon Survey || — || align=right | 1.0 km || 
|-id=928 bgcolor=#d6d6d6
| 290928 ||  || — || November 25, 2005 || Mount Lemmon || Mount Lemmon Survey || THM || align=right | 3.0 km || 
|-id=929 bgcolor=#E9E9E9
| 290929 ||  || — || November 25, 2005 || Mount Lemmon || Mount Lemmon Survey || HEN || align=right | 1.4 km || 
|-id=930 bgcolor=#E9E9E9
| 290930 ||  || — || November 26, 2005 || Kitt Peak || Spacewatch || — || align=right | 1.5 km || 
|-id=931 bgcolor=#fefefe
| 290931 ||  || — || November 26, 2005 || Kitt Peak || Spacewatch || — || align=right | 1.0 km || 
|-id=932 bgcolor=#d6d6d6
| 290932 ||  || — || November 26, 2005 || Mount Lemmon || Mount Lemmon Survey || — || align=right | 3.2 km || 
|-id=933 bgcolor=#d6d6d6
| 290933 ||  || — || November 26, 2005 || Mount Lemmon || Mount Lemmon Survey || — || align=right | 3.8 km || 
|-id=934 bgcolor=#d6d6d6
| 290934 ||  || — || November 26, 2005 || Mount Lemmon || Mount Lemmon Survey || 3:2 || align=right | 6.9 km || 
|-id=935 bgcolor=#E9E9E9
| 290935 ||  || — || November 26, 2005 || Mount Lemmon || Mount Lemmon Survey || MAR || align=right | 1.5 km || 
|-id=936 bgcolor=#fefefe
| 290936 ||  || — || November 30, 2005 || Kitt Peak || Spacewatch || MAS || align=right data-sort-value="0.87" | 870 m || 
|-id=937 bgcolor=#E9E9E9
| 290937 ||  || — || November 25, 2005 || Kitt Peak || Spacewatch || HEN || align=right | 1.1 km || 
|-id=938 bgcolor=#E9E9E9
| 290938 ||  || — || November 25, 2005 || Kitt Peak || Spacewatch || AEO || align=right | 1.5 km || 
|-id=939 bgcolor=#fefefe
| 290939 ||  || — || November 28, 2005 || Kitt Peak || Spacewatch || FLO || align=right data-sort-value="0.70" | 700 m || 
|-id=940 bgcolor=#d6d6d6
| 290940 ||  || — || November 28, 2005 || Kitt Peak || Spacewatch || — || align=right | 4.5 km || 
|-id=941 bgcolor=#d6d6d6
| 290941 ||  || — || November 28, 2005 || Socorro || LINEAR || — || align=right | 4.3 km || 
|-id=942 bgcolor=#d6d6d6
| 290942 ||  || — || November 29, 2005 || Kitt Peak || Spacewatch || — || align=right | 3.2 km || 
|-id=943 bgcolor=#d6d6d6
| 290943 ||  || — || November 29, 2005 || Palomar || NEAT || VER || align=right | 4.0 km || 
|-id=944 bgcolor=#d6d6d6
| 290944 ||  || — || November 29, 2005 || Palomar || NEAT || — || align=right | 3.7 km || 
|-id=945 bgcolor=#E9E9E9
| 290945 ||  || — || November 29, 2005 || Palomar || NEAT || EUN || align=right | 1.7 km || 
|-id=946 bgcolor=#E9E9E9
| 290946 ||  || — || November 26, 2005 || Mount Lemmon || Mount Lemmon Survey || — || align=right | 2.3 km || 
|-id=947 bgcolor=#d6d6d6
| 290947 ||  || — || November 30, 2005 || Kitt Peak || Spacewatch || THM || align=right | 3.0 km || 
|-id=948 bgcolor=#fefefe
| 290948 ||  || — || November 29, 2005 || Mount Lemmon || Mount Lemmon Survey || — || align=right data-sort-value="0.99" | 990 m || 
|-id=949 bgcolor=#d6d6d6
| 290949 ||  || — || November 30, 2005 || Kitt Peak || Spacewatch || — || align=right | 4.1 km || 
|-id=950 bgcolor=#fefefe
| 290950 ||  || — || November 30, 2005 || Kitt Peak || Spacewatch || NYS || align=right data-sort-value="0.73" | 730 m || 
|-id=951 bgcolor=#fefefe
| 290951 ||  || — || November 30, 2005 || Mount Lemmon || Mount Lemmon Survey || MAS || align=right data-sort-value="0.90" | 900 m || 
|-id=952 bgcolor=#d6d6d6
| 290952 ||  || — || November 30, 2005 || Mount Lemmon || Mount Lemmon Survey || — || align=right | 3.2 km || 
|-id=953 bgcolor=#d6d6d6
| 290953 ||  || — || November 30, 2005 || Kitt Peak || Spacewatch || — || align=right | 4.6 km || 
|-id=954 bgcolor=#d6d6d6
| 290954 ||  || — || November 30, 2005 || Socorro || LINEAR || — || align=right | 5.3 km || 
|-id=955 bgcolor=#d6d6d6
| 290955 ||  || — || November 30, 2005 || Mount Lemmon || Mount Lemmon Survey || KOR || align=right | 1.5 km || 
|-id=956 bgcolor=#fefefe
| 290956 ||  || — || November 21, 2005 || Catalina || CSS || — || align=right data-sort-value="0.85" | 850 m || 
|-id=957 bgcolor=#E9E9E9
| 290957 ||  || — || November 22, 2005 || Catalina || CSS || — || align=right | 2.4 km || 
|-id=958 bgcolor=#d6d6d6
| 290958 ||  || — || November 25, 2005 || Catalina || CSS || — || align=right | 4.6 km || 
|-id=959 bgcolor=#d6d6d6
| 290959 ||  || — || November 25, 2005 || Catalina || CSS || EOS || align=right | 2.3 km || 
|-id=960 bgcolor=#E9E9E9
| 290960 ||  || — || November 30, 2005 || Socorro || LINEAR || — || align=right | 3.6 km || 
|-id=961 bgcolor=#fefefe
| 290961 ||  || — || November 29, 2005 || Mount Lemmon || Mount Lemmon Survey || — || align=right data-sort-value="0.86" | 860 m || 
|-id=962 bgcolor=#d6d6d6
| 290962 ||  || — || November 21, 2005 || Catalina || CSS || — || align=right | 3.9 km || 
|-id=963 bgcolor=#d6d6d6
| 290963 ||  || — || November 21, 2005 || Anderson Mesa || LONEOS || EOS || align=right | 2.3 km || 
|-id=964 bgcolor=#E9E9E9
| 290964 ||  || — || November 26, 2005 || Catalina || CSS || HNA || align=right | 2.9 km || 
|-id=965 bgcolor=#d6d6d6
| 290965 ||  || — || November 21, 2005 || Kitt Peak || Spacewatch || — || align=right | 2.8 km || 
|-id=966 bgcolor=#fefefe
| 290966 ||  || — || November 28, 2005 || Catalina || CSS || — || align=right | 1.1 km || 
|-id=967 bgcolor=#d6d6d6
| 290967 ||  || — || December 1, 2005 || Junk Bond || D. Healy || K-2 || align=right | 2.2 km || 
|-id=968 bgcolor=#fefefe
| 290968 ||  || — || December 4, 2005 || Socorro || LINEAR || — || align=right | 1.1 km || 
|-id=969 bgcolor=#fefefe
| 290969 ||  || — || December 2, 2005 || Mount Lemmon || Mount Lemmon Survey || — || align=right data-sort-value="0.79" | 790 m || 
|-id=970 bgcolor=#fefefe
| 290970 ||  || — || December 4, 2005 || Socorro || LINEAR || V || align=right data-sort-value="0.91" | 910 m || 
|-id=971 bgcolor=#E9E9E9
| 290971 ||  || — || December 1, 2005 || Kitt Peak || Spacewatch || — || align=right | 2.5 km || 
|-id=972 bgcolor=#fefefe
| 290972 ||  || — || December 1, 2005 || Kitt Peak || Spacewatch || — || align=right | 1.0 km || 
|-id=973 bgcolor=#fefefe
| 290973 ||  || — || December 1, 2005 || Kitt Peak || Spacewatch || — || align=right | 2.1 km || 
|-id=974 bgcolor=#fefefe
| 290974 ||  || — || December 1, 2005 || Kitt Peak || Spacewatch || — || align=right | 1.0 km || 
|-id=975 bgcolor=#E9E9E9
| 290975 ||  || — || December 1, 2005 || Palomar || NEAT || — || align=right | 2.2 km || 
|-id=976 bgcolor=#d6d6d6
| 290976 ||  || — || December 2, 2005 || Kitt Peak || Spacewatch || — || align=right | 4.1 km || 
|-id=977 bgcolor=#d6d6d6
| 290977 ||  || — || December 4, 2005 || Kitt Peak || Spacewatch || THM || align=right | 2.5 km || 
|-id=978 bgcolor=#fefefe
| 290978 ||  || — || December 4, 2005 || Kitt Peak || Spacewatch || — || align=right | 1.1 km || 
|-id=979 bgcolor=#fefefe
| 290979 ||  || — || December 4, 2005 || Kitt Peak || Spacewatch || MAS || align=right data-sort-value="0.62" | 620 m || 
|-id=980 bgcolor=#E9E9E9
| 290980 ||  || — || December 6, 2005 || Kitt Peak || Spacewatch || — || align=right | 1.6 km || 
|-id=981 bgcolor=#E9E9E9
| 290981 ||  || — || December 1, 2005 || Catalina || CSS || — || align=right | 1.7 km || 
|-id=982 bgcolor=#d6d6d6
| 290982 ||  || — || December 2, 2005 || Kitt Peak || Spacewatch || — || align=right | 5.9 km || 
|-id=983 bgcolor=#d6d6d6
| 290983 ||  || — || December 2, 2005 || Kitt Peak || Spacewatch || — || align=right | 2.9 km || 
|-id=984 bgcolor=#d6d6d6
| 290984 ||  || — || December 2, 2005 || Kitt Peak || Spacewatch || — || align=right | 3.7 km || 
|-id=985 bgcolor=#fefefe
| 290985 ||  || — || December 2, 2005 || Kitt Peak || Spacewatch || — || align=right | 2.2 km || 
|-id=986 bgcolor=#fefefe
| 290986 ||  || — || December 2, 2005 || Kitt Peak || Spacewatch || — || align=right | 1.2 km || 
|-id=987 bgcolor=#E9E9E9
| 290987 ||  || — || December 2, 2005 || Kitt Peak || Spacewatch || WIT || align=right | 1.2 km || 
|-id=988 bgcolor=#d6d6d6
| 290988 ||  || — || December 2, 2005 || Kitt Peak || Spacewatch || 7:4 || align=right | 5.9 km || 
|-id=989 bgcolor=#E9E9E9
| 290989 ||  || — || December 4, 2005 || Kitt Peak || Spacewatch || AGN || align=right | 1.3 km || 
|-id=990 bgcolor=#fefefe
| 290990 ||  || — || December 4, 2005 || Kitt Peak || Spacewatch || — || align=right | 1.1 km || 
|-id=991 bgcolor=#d6d6d6
| 290991 ||  || — || December 5, 2005 || Mount Lemmon || Mount Lemmon Survey || 7:4 || align=right | 3.9 km || 
|-id=992 bgcolor=#fefefe
| 290992 ||  || — || December 6, 2005 || Socorro || LINEAR || NYS || align=right | 1.0 km || 
|-id=993 bgcolor=#fefefe
| 290993 ||  || — || December 7, 2005 || Socorro || LINEAR || — || align=right | 1.1 km || 
|-id=994 bgcolor=#fefefe
| 290994 ||  || — || December 6, 2005 || Kitt Peak || Spacewatch || FLO || align=right data-sort-value="0.72" | 720 m || 
|-id=995 bgcolor=#E9E9E9
| 290995 ||  || — || December 6, 2005 || Kitt Peak || Spacewatch || — || align=right | 1.8 km || 
|-id=996 bgcolor=#E9E9E9
| 290996 ||  || — || December 8, 2005 || Kitt Peak || Spacewatch || — || align=right | 1.1 km || 
|-id=997 bgcolor=#fefefe
| 290997 ||  || — || December 10, 2005 || Kitt Peak || Spacewatch || NYS || align=right data-sort-value="0.86" | 860 m || 
|-id=998 bgcolor=#d6d6d6
| 290998 ||  || — || December 10, 2005 || Kitt Peak || Spacewatch || HYG || align=right | 3.2 km || 
|-id=999 bgcolor=#d6d6d6
| 290999 ||  || — || December 6, 2005 || Anderson Mesa || LONEOS || — || align=right | 2.9 km || 
|-id=000 bgcolor=#E9E9E9
| 291000 ||  || — || December 2, 2005 || Kitt Peak || Spacewatch || HOF || align=right | 2.5 km || 
|}

References

External links 
 Discovery Circumstances: Numbered Minor Planets (290001)–(295000) (IAU Minor Planet Center)

0290